

238001–238100 

|-bgcolor=#d6d6d6
| 238001 ||  || — || October 4, 2002 || Socorro || LINEAR || — || align=right | 3.2 km || 
|-id=002 bgcolor=#E9E9E9
| 238002 ||  || — || October 3, 2002 || Socorro || LINEAR || AEO || align=right | 1.8 km || 
|-id=003 bgcolor=#E9E9E9
| 238003 ||  || — || October 4, 2002 || Socorro || LINEAR || — || align=right | 3.3 km || 
|-id=004 bgcolor=#d6d6d6
| 238004 ||  || — || October 3, 2002 || Socorro || LINEAR || KOR || align=right | 2.2 km || 
|-id=005 bgcolor=#d6d6d6
| 238005 ||  || — || October 5, 2002 || Kitt Peak || Spacewatch || — || align=right | 3.4 km || 
|-id=006 bgcolor=#E9E9E9
| 238006 ||  || — || October 5, 2002 || Socorro || LINEAR || — || align=right | 4.9 km || 
|-id=007 bgcolor=#E9E9E9
| 238007 ||  || — || October 2, 2002 || Haleakala || NEAT || — || align=right | 4.6 km || 
|-id=008 bgcolor=#d6d6d6
| 238008 ||  || — || October 6, 2002 || Haleakala || NEAT || LUT || align=right | 7.2 km || 
|-id=009 bgcolor=#E9E9E9
| 238009 ||  || — || October 7, 2002 || Haleakala || NEAT || — || align=right | 2.4 km || 
|-id=010 bgcolor=#fefefe
| 238010 ||  || — || October 7, 2002 || Haleakala || NEAT || — || align=right | 1.7 km || 
|-id=011 bgcolor=#d6d6d6
| 238011 ||  || — || October 10, 2002 || Palomar || NEAT || — || align=right | 3.4 km || 
|-id=012 bgcolor=#E9E9E9
| 238012 ||  || — || October 4, 2002 || Apache Point || SDSS || DOR || align=right | 4.0 km || 
|-id=013 bgcolor=#d6d6d6
| 238013 ||  || — || October 4, 2002 || Apache Point || SDSS || — || align=right | 3.6 km || 
|-id=014 bgcolor=#d6d6d6
| 238014 ||  || — || October 5, 2002 || Apache Point || SDSS || KAR || align=right | 1.4 km || 
|-id=015 bgcolor=#E9E9E9
| 238015 ||  || — || October 10, 2002 || Apache Point || SDSS || GEF || align=right | 1.2 km || 
|-id=016 bgcolor=#d6d6d6
| 238016 ||  || — || October 9, 2002 || Palomar || NEAT || — || align=right | 3.1 km || 
|-id=017 bgcolor=#d6d6d6
| 238017 ||  || — || October 30, 2002 || Palomar || NEAT || — || align=right | 3.4 km || 
|-id=018 bgcolor=#d6d6d6
| 238018 ||  || — || October 31, 2002 || Palomar || NEAT || — || align=right | 5.6 km || 
|-id=019 bgcolor=#E9E9E9
| 238019 ||  || — || October 30, 2002 || Kitt Peak || Spacewatch || — || align=right | 2.2 km || 
|-id=020 bgcolor=#d6d6d6
| 238020 ||  || — || October 29, 2002 || Apache Point || SDSS || — || align=right | 3.4 km || 
|-id=021 bgcolor=#d6d6d6
| 238021 ||  || — || October 29, 2002 || Palomar || NEAT || — || align=right | 3.6 km || 
|-id=022 bgcolor=#d6d6d6
| 238022 ||  || — || November 5, 2002 || Wrightwood || J. W. Young || THM || align=right | 3.6 km || 
|-id=023 bgcolor=#fefefe
| 238023 ||  || — || November 1, 2002 || Socorro || LINEAR || — || align=right | 1.1 km || 
|-id=024 bgcolor=#fefefe
| 238024 ||  || — || November 5, 2002 || Socorro || LINEAR || — || align=right | 1.7 km || 
|-id=025 bgcolor=#d6d6d6
| 238025 ||  || — || November 5, 2002 || Socorro || LINEAR || THM || align=right | 3.4 km || 
|-id=026 bgcolor=#d6d6d6
| 238026 ||  || — || November 5, 2002 || Socorro || LINEAR || — || align=right | 5.8 km || 
|-id=027 bgcolor=#d6d6d6
| 238027 ||  || — || November 5, 2002 || Anderson Mesa || LONEOS || — || align=right | 5.3 km || 
|-id=028 bgcolor=#d6d6d6
| 238028 ||  || — || November 11, 2002 || Socorro || LINEAR || — || align=right | 3.6 km || 
|-id=029 bgcolor=#d6d6d6
| 238029 ||  || — || November 12, 2002 || Socorro || LINEAR || ALA || align=right | 6.4 km || 
|-id=030 bgcolor=#fefefe
| 238030 ||  || — || November 12, 2002 || Socorro || LINEAR || — || align=right | 1.2 km || 
|-id=031 bgcolor=#d6d6d6
| 238031 ||  || — || November 24, 2002 || Palomar || NEAT || — || align=right | 5.3 km || 
|-id=032 bgcolor=#fefefe
| 238032 ||  || — || November 24, 2002 || Palomar || NEAT || — || align=right data-sort-value="0.98" | 980 m || 
|-id=033 bgcolor=#d6d6d6
| 238033 ||  || — || November 24, 2002 || Palomar || NEAT || THM || align=right | 2.5 km || 
|-id=034 bgcolor=#d6d6d6
| 238034 ||  || — || November 23, 2002 || Palomar || NEAT || 628 || align=right | 2.4 km || 
|-id=035 bgcolor=#E9E9E9
| 238035 ||  || — || December 7, 2002 || Socorro || LINEAR || — || align=right | 3.0 km || 
|-id=036 bgcolor=#fefefe
| 238036 ||  || — || December 10, 2002 || Socorro || LINEAR || NYS || align=right | 1.9 km || 
|-id=037 bgcolor=#d6d6d6
| 238037 ||  || — || December 10, 2002 || Socorro || LINEAR || URS || align=right | 5.9 km || 
|-id=038 bgcolor=#d6d6d6
| 238038 ||  || — || December 11, 2002 || Socorro || LINEAR || — || align=right | 3.5 km || 
|-id=039 bgcolor=#E9E9E9
| 238039 ||  || — || December 11, 2002 || Socorro || LINEAR || HNA || align=right | 3.2 km || 
|-id=040 bgcolor=#d6d6d6
| 238040 ||  || — || December 10, 2002 || Palomar || NEAT || — || align=right | 4.8 km || 
|-id=041 bgcolor=#fefefe
| 238041 ||  || — || December 31, 2002 || Kitt Peak || Spacewatch || FLO || align=right data-sort-value="0.89" | 890 m || 
|-id=042 bgcolor=#d6d6d6
| 238042 ||  || — || January 1, 2003 || Socorro || LINEAR || — || align=right | 4.1 km || 
|-id=043 bgcolor=#fefefe
| 238043 ||  || — || January 4, 2003 || Socorro || LINEAR || — || align=right | 1.0 km || 
|-id=044 bgcolor=#fefefe
| 238044 ||  || — || January 5, 2003 || Socorro || LINEAR || — || align=right data-sort-value="0.76" | 760 m || 
|-id=045 bgcolor=#d6d6d6
| 238045 ||  || — || January 5, 2003 || Socorro || LINEAR || — || align=right | 5.2 km || 
|-id=046 bgcolor=#fefefe
| 238046 ||  || — || January 26, 2003 || Haleakala || NEAT || — || align=right | 1.2 km || 
|-id=047 bgcolor=#fefefe
| 238047 ||  || — || January 27, 2003 || Anderson Mesa || LONEOS || FLO || align=right data-sort-value="0.93" | 930 m || 
|-id=048 bgcolor=#fefefe
| 238048 ||  || — || January 28, 2003 || Kitt Peak || Spacewatch || FLO || align=right data-sort-value="0.85" | 850 m || 
|-id=049 bgcolor=#fefefe
| 238049 ||  || — || January 27, 2003 || Haleakala || NEAT || — || align=right | 1.3 km || 
|-id=050 bgcolor=#fefefe
| 238050 ||  || — || January 28, 2003 || Socorro || LINEAR || — || align=right | 1.0 km || 
|-id=051 bgcolor=#fefefe
| 238051 ||  || — || January 27, 2003 || Socorro || LINEAR || ERI || align=right | 2.1 km || 
|-id=052 bgcolor=#fefefe
| 238052 ||  || — || January 27, 2003 || Socorro || LINEAR || — || align=right | 1.2 km || 
|-id=053 bgcolor=#fefefe
| 238053 ||  || — || January 30, 2003 || Anderson Mesa || LONEOS || FLO || align=right | 1.4 km || 
|-id=054 bgcolor=#fefefe
| 238054 ||  || — || January 31, 2003 || Socorro || LINEAR || ERI || align=right | 2.4 km || 
|-id=055 bgcolor=#fefefe
| 238055 ||  || — || January 28, 2003 || Haleakala || NEAT || — || align=right | 1.1 km || 
|-id=056 bgcolor=#d6d6d6
| 238056 ||  || — || January 29, 2003 || Palomar || NEAT || — || align=right | 5.8 km || 
|-id=057 bgcolor=#fefefe
| 238057 ||  || — || January 30, 2003 || Palomar || NEAT || NYS || align=right data-sort-value="0.80" | 800 m || 
|-id=058 bgcolor=#fefefe
| 238058 ||  || — || February 1, 2003 || Socorro || LINEAR || V || align=right | 1.1 km || 
|-id=059 bgcolor=#fefefe
| 238059 ||  || — || February 2, 2003 || Anderson Mesa || LONEOS || — || align=right | 1.1 km || 
|-id=060 bgcolor=#fefefe
| 238060 ||  || — || February 1, 2003 || Socorro || LINEAR || — || align=right data-sort-value="0.83" | 830 m || 
|-id=061 bgcolor=#fefefe
| 238061 ||  || — || February 7, 2003 || Desert Eagle || W. K. Y. Yeung || — || align=right | 3.4 km || 
|-id=062 bgcolor=#fefefe
| 238062 ||  || — || February 22, 2003 || Goodricke-Pigott || J. W. Kessel || — || align=right | 1.1 km || 
|-id=063 bgcolor=#FFC2E0
| 238063 ||  || — || March 3, 2003 || Socorro || LINEAR || APO +1km || align=right | 1.5 km || 
|-id=064 bgcolor=#fefefe
| 238064 ||  || — || March 7, 2003 || Palomar || NEAT || FLO || align=right | 1.0 km || 
|-id=065 bgcolor=#fefefe
| 238065 ||  || — || March 6, 2003 || Socorro || LINEAR || NYS || align=right data-sort-value="0.93" | 930 m || 
|-id=066 bgcolor=#fefefe
| 238066 ||  || — || March 7, 2003 || Anderson Mesa || LONEOS || FLO || align=right | 1.9 km || 
|-id=067 bgcolor=#fefefe
| 238067 ||  || — || March 7, 2003 || Anderson Mesa || LONEOS || FLO || align=right data-sort-value="0.97" | 970 m || 
|-id=068 bgcolor=#fefefe
| 238068 ||  || — || March 8, 2003 || Socorro || LINEAR || CIM || align=right | 3.4 km || 
|-id=069 bgcolor=#fefefe
| 238069 ||  || — || March 8, 2003 || Socorro || LINEAR || PHO || align=right | 1.4 km || 
|-id=070 bgcolor=#fefefe
| 238070 ||  || — || March 9, 2003 || Anderson Mesa || LONEOS || PHO || align=right | 1.2 km || 
|-id=071 bgcolor=#fefefe
| 238071 ||  || — || March 23, 2003 || Haleakala || NEAT || PHO || align=right | 2.1 km || 
|-id=072 bgcolor=#FA8072
| 238072 ||  || — || March 30, 2003 || Socorro || LINEAR || — || align=right | 2.0 km || 
|-id=073 bgcolor=#fefefe
| 238073 ||  || — || March 24, 2003 || Kitt Peak || Spacewatch || — || align=right | 1.2 km || 
|-id=074 bgcolor=#fefefe
| 238074 ||  || — || March 23, 2003 || Kitt Peak || Spacewatch || FLO || align=right | 1.7 km || 
|-id=075 bgcolor=#fefefe
| 238075 ||  || — || March 26, 2003 || Palomar || NEAT || NYS || align=right | 1.0 km || 
|-id=076 bgcolor=#fefefe
| 238076 ||  || — || March 26, 2003 || Palomar || NEAT || NYS || align=right | 2.4 km || 
|-id=077 bgcolor=#fefefe
| 238077 ||  || — || March 26, 2003 || Kitt Peak || Spacewatch || — || align=right | 1.1 km || 
|-id=078 bgcolor=#fefefe
| 238078 ||  || — || March 27, 2003 || Palomar || NEAT || — || align=right | 1.1 km || 
|-id=079 bgcolor=#d6d6d6
| 238079 ||  || — || March 29, 2003 || Anderson Mesa || LONEOS || — || align=right | 4.6 km || 
|-id=080 bgcolor=#fefefe
| 238080 ||  || — || March 29, 2003 || Anderson Mesa || LONEOS || — || align=right | 1.8 km || 
|-id=081 bgcolor=#fefefe
| 238081 ||  || — || March 30, 2003 || Anderson Mesa || LONEOS || — || align=right data-sort-value="0.86" | 860 m || 
|-id=082 bgcolor=#fefefe
| 238082 ||  || — || March 30, 2003 || Socorro || LINEAR || CIM || align=right | 3.0 km || 
|-id=083 bgcolor=#fefefe
| 238083 ||  || — || March 30, 2003 || Socorro || LINEAR || FLO || align=right | 1.4 km || 
|-id=084 bgcolor=#fefefe
| 238084 ||  || — || March 30, 2003 || Socorro || LINEAR || NYS || align=right data-sort-value="0.86" | 860 m || 
|-id=085 bgcolor=#fefefe
| 238085 ||  || — || March 31, 2003 || Socorro || LINEAR || — || align=right | 1.4 km || 
|-id=086 bgcolor=#fefefe
| 238086 ||  || — || March 31, 2003 || Anderson Mesa || LONEOS || — || align=right | 3.4 km || 
|-id=087 bgcolor=#fefefe
| 238087 ||  || — || March 26, 2003 || Palomar || NEAT || — || align=right | 1.5 km || 
|-id=088 bgcolor=#fefefe
| 238088 ||  || — || April 5, 2003 || Anderson Mesa || LONEOS || — || align=right | 1.2 km || 
|-id=089 bgcolor=#fefefe
| 238089 ||  || — || April 8, 2003 || Socorro || LINEAR || FLO || align=right | 1.3 km || 
|-id=090 bgcolor=#fefefe
| 238090 ||  || — || April 7, 2003 || Socorro || LINEAR || V || align=right data-sort-value="0.98" | 980 m || 
|-id=091 bgcolor=#fefefe
| 238091 ||  || — || April 10, 2003 || Kitt Peak || Spacewatch || — || align=right | 1.0 km || 
|-id=092 bgcolor=#fefefe
| 238092 ||  || — || April 10, 2003 || Kitt Peak || Spacewatch || NYS || align=right data-sort-value="0.76" | 760 m || 
|-id=093 bgcolor=#fefefe
| 238093 ||  || — || April 26, 2003 || Socorro || LINEAR || — || align=right | 2.7 km || 
|-id=094 bgcolor=#fefefe
| 238094 ||  || — || April 25, 2003 || Anderson Mesa || LONEOS || FLO || align=right data-sort-value="0.91" | 910 m || 
|-id=095 bgcolor=#fefefe
| 238095 ||  || — || April 26, 2003 || Kitt Peak || Spacewatch || NYS || align=right | 1.0 km || 
|-id=096 bgcolor=#fefefe
| 238096 ||  || — || April 25, 2003 || Kitt Peak || Spacewatch || NYS || align=right data-sort-value="0.63" | 630 m || 
|-id=097 bgcolor=#fefefe
| 238097 ||  || — || April 27, 2003 || Anderson Mesa || LONEOS || — || align=right data-sort-value="0.85" | 850 m || 
|-id=098 bgcolor=#fefefe
| 238098 ||  || — || April 28, 2003 || Anderson Mesa || LONEOS || NYS || align=right | 1.1 km || 
|-id=099 bgcolor=#fefefe
| 238099 ||  || — || April 28, 2003 || Anderson Mesa || LONEOS || — || align=right | 1.1 km || 
|-id=100 bgcolor=#fefefe
| 238100 ||  || — || April 27, 2003 || Socorro || LINEAR || — || align=right | 1.4 km || 
|}

238101–238200 

|-bgcolor=#fefefe
| 238101 ||  || — || April 27, 2003 || Anderson Mesa || LONEOS || NYS || align=right data-sort-value="0.87" | 870 m || 
|-id=102 bgcolor=#fefefe
| 238102 ||  || — || April 26, 2003 || Haleakala || NEAT || — || align=right | 1.7 km || 
|-id=103 bgcolor=#fefefe
| 238103 ||  || — || April 29, 2003 || Socorro || LINEAR || PHO || align=right | 1.7 km || 
|-id=104 bgcolor=#fefefe
| 238104 ||  || — || April 28, 2003 || Socorro || LINEAR || — || align=right | 1.1 km || 
|-id=105 bgcolor=#fefefe
| 238105 ||  || — || April 28, 2003 || Socorro || LINEAR || — || align=right | 1.2 km || 
|-id=106 bgcolor=#fefefe
| 238106 ||  || — || April 25, 2003 || Kitt Peak || Spacewatch || — || align=right | 1.9 km || 
|-id=107 bgcolor=#fefefe
| 238107 ||  || — || May 2, 2003 || Kitt Peak || Spacewatch || — || align=right | 2.4 km || 
|-id=108 bgcolor=#fefefe
| 238108 ||  || — || May 2, 2003 || Socorro || LINEAR || — || align=right | 1.1 km || 
|-id=109 bgcolor=#E9E9E9
| 238109 ||  || — || May 5, 2003 || Socorro || LINEAR || — || align=right | 2.4 km || 
|-id=110 bgcolor=#fefefe
| 238110 ||  || — || May 27, 2003 || Haleakala || NEAT || — || align=right data-sort-value="0.95" | 950 m || 
|-id=111 bgcolor=#fefefe
| 238111 ||  || — || May 21, 2003 || Anderson Mesa || LONEOS || — || align=right | 1.9 km || 
|-id=112 bgcolor=#fefefe
| 238112 ||  || — || May 30, 2003 || Socorro || LINEAR || — || align=right | 2.7 km || 
|-id=113 bgcolor=#fefefe
| 238113 ||  || — || May 23, 2003 || Kitt Peak || Spacewatch || FLO || align=right data-sort-value="0.84" | 840 m || 
|-id=114 bgcolor=#d6d6d6
| 238114 || 2003 MX || — || June 21, 2003 || Bergisch Gladbach || W. Bickel || 3:2 || align=right | 8.0 km || 
|-id=115 bgcolor=#E9E9E9
| 238115 ||  || — || June 23, 2003 || Socorro || LINEAR || — || align=right | 1.9 km || 
|-id=116 bgcolor=#E9E9E9
| 238116 || 2003 OE || — || July 18, 2003 || Siding Spring || R. H. McNaught || — || align=right | 1.2 km || 
|-id=117 bgcolor=#E9E9E9
| 238117 ||  || — || July 22, 2003 || Haleakala || NEAT || — || align=right | 1.3 km || 
|-id=118 bgcolor=#fefefe
| 238118 ||  || — || July 26, 2003 || Socorro || LINEAR || ERI || align=right | 2.0 km || 
|-id=119 bgcolor=#E9E9E9
| 238119 ||  || — || July 30, 2003 || Palomar || NEAT || — || align=right | 4.6 km || 
|-id=120 bgcolor=#fefefe
| 238120 ||  || — || July 31, 2003 || Reedy Creek || J. Broughton || V || align=right | 1.2 km || 
|-id=121 bgcolor=#E9E9E9
| 238121 ||  || — || July 22, 2003 || Campo Imperatore || CINEOS || — || align=right | 3.5 km || 
|-id=122 bgcolor=#fefefe
| 238122 ||  || — || July 24, 2003 || Palomar || NEAT || NYS || align=right data-sort-value="0.95" | 950 m || 
|-id=123 bgcolor=#E9E9E9
| 238123 ||  || — || July 24, 2003 || Palomar || NEAT || — || align=right | 1.7 km || 
|-id=124 bgcolor=#E9E9E9
| 238124 ||  || — || July 23, 2003 || Palomar || NEAT || HNS || align=right | 1.7 km || 
|-id=125 bgcolor=#E9E9E9
| 238125 ||  || — || August 2, 2003 || Haleakala || NEAT || — || align=right | 1.7 km || 
|-id=126 bgcolor=#E9E9E9
| 238126 ||  || — || August 18, 2003 || Campo Imperatore || CINEOS || — || align=right | 2.2 km || 
|-id=127 bgcolor=#fefefe
| 238127 ||  || — || August 20, 2003 || Campo Imperatore || CINEOS || NYS || align=right data-sort-value="0.83" | 830 m || 
|-id=128 bgcolor=#E9E9E9
| 238128 ||  || — || August 22, 2003 || Haleakala || NEAT || CLO || align=right | 3.5 km || 
|-id=129 bgcolor=#fefefe
| 238129 Bernardwolfe ||  ||  || August 24, 2003 || Saint-Sulpice || B. Christophe || — || align=right | 1.4 km || 
|-id=130 bgcolor=#fefefe
| 238130 ||  || — || August 22, 2003 || Socorro || LINEAR || — || align=right | 1.5 km || 
|-id=131 bgcolor=#fefefe
| 238131 ||  || — || August 23, 2003 || Socorro || LINEAR || NYS || align=right | 1.1 km || 
|-id=132 bgcolor=#fefefe
| 238132 ||  || — || August 23, 2003 || Palomar || NEAT || — || align=right | 1.1 km || 
|-id=133 bgcolor=#E9E9E9
| 238133 ||  || — || August 23, 2003 || Socorro || LINEAR || EUN || align=right | 1.7 km || 
|-id=134 bgcolor=#E9E9E9
| 238134 ||  || — || August 22, 2003 || Socorro || LINEAR || ADE || align=right | 4.0 km || 
|-id=135 bgcolor=#fefefe
| 238135 ||  || — || August 24, 2003 || Kvistaberg || UDAS || H || align=right data-sort-value="0.87" | 870 m || 
|-id=136 bgcolor=#E9E9E9
| 238136 ||  || — || August 23, 2003 || Palomar || NEAT || HNS || align=right | 1.8 km || 
|-id=137 bgcolor=#fefefe
| 238137 ||  || — || August 31, 2003 || Haleakala || NEAT || — || align=right | 1.1 km || 
|-id=138 bgcolor=#d6d6d6
| 238138 ||  || — || August 31, 2003 || Socorro || LINEAR || — || align=right | 4.4 km || 
|-id=139 bgcolor=#fefefe
| 238139 ||  || — || September 1, 2003 || Socorro || LINEAR || H || align=right | 1.1 km || 
|-id=140 bgcolor=#fefefe
| 238140 ||  || — || September 4, 2003 || Reedy Creek || J. Broughton || KLI || align=right | 3.9 km || 
|-id=141 bgcolor=#E9E9E9
| 238141 ||  || — || September 15, 2003 || Palomar || NEAT || — || align=right | 2.2 km || 
|-id=142 bgcolor=#E9E9E9
| 238142 ||  || — || September 14, 2003 || Haleakala || NEAT || — || align=right | 3.9 km || 
|-id=143 bgcolor=#E9E9E9
| 238143 ||  || — || September 16, 2003 || Kitt Peak || Spacewatch || HOF || align=right | 2.7 km || 
|-id=144 bgcolor=#E9E9E9
| 238144 ||  || — || September 16, 2003 || Kitt Peak || Spacewatch || — || align=right | 2.8 km || 
|-id=145 bgcolor=#E9E9E9
| 238145 ||  || — || September 18, 2003 || Kitt Peak || Spacewatch || HOF || align=right | 3.7 km || 
|-id=146 bgcolor=#E9E9E9
| 238146 ||  || — || September 18, 2003 || Desert Eagle || W. K. Y. Yeung || — || align=right | 2.4 km || 
|-id=147 bgcolor=#E9E9E9
| 238147 ||  || — || September 16, 2003 || Palomar || NEAT || — || align=right | 2.2 km || 
|-id=148 bgcolor=#fefefe
| 238148 ||  || — || September 16, 2003 || Palomar || NEAT || — || align=right | 1.3 km || 
|-id=149 bgcolor=#E9E9E9
| 238149 ||  || — || September 17, 2003 || Palomar || NEAT || HNS || align=right | 1.7 km || 
|-id=150 bgcolor=#E9E9E9
| 238150 ||  || — || September 17, 2003 || Palomar || NEAT || CLO || align=right | 3.0 km || 
|-id=151 bgcolor=#E9E9E9
| 238151 ||  || — || September 17, 2003 || Palomar || NEAT || — || align=right | 1.6 km || 
|-id=152 bgcolor=#fefefe
| 238152 ||  || — || September 17, 2003 || Socorro || LINEAR || H || align=right data-sort-value="0.96" | 960 m || 
|-id=153 bgcolor=#E9E9E9
| 238153 ||  || — || September 16, 2003 || Anderson Mesa || LONEOS || — || align=right | 2.8 km || 
|-id=154 bgcolor=#d6d6d6
| 238154 ||  || — || September 18, 2003 || Palomar || NEAT || HIL3:2 || align=right | 10 km || 
|-id=155 bgcolor=#d6d6d6
| 238155 ||  || — || September 16, 2003 || Anderson Mesa || LONEOS || — || align=right | 3.5 km || 
|-id=156 bgcolor=#fefefe
| 238156 ||  || — || September 16, 2003 || Anderson Mesa || LONEOS || — || align=right | 1.2 km || 
|-id=157 bgcolor=#E9E9E9
| 238157 ||  || — || September 17, 2003 || Anderson Mesa || LONEOS || — || align=right | 1.1 km || 
|-id=158 bgcolor=#E9E9E9
| 238158 ||  || — || September 18, 2003 || Kitt Peak || Spacewatch || — || align=right | 1.5 km || 
|-id=159 bgcolor=#E9E9E9
| 238159 ||  || — || September 18, 2003 || Kitt Peak || Spacewatch || — || align=right | 2.8 km || 
|-id=160 bgcolor=#E9E9E9
| 238160 ||  || — || September 18, 2003 || Kitt Peak || Spacewatch || — || align=right | 3.7 km || 
|-id=161 bgcolor=#E9E9E9
| 238161 ||  || — || September 19, 2003 || Kitt Peak || Spacewatch || — || align=right | 1.6 km || 
|-id=162 bgcolor=#E9E9E9
| 238162 ||  || — || September 16, 2003 || Kitt Peak || Spacewatch || — || align=right | 2.2 km || 
|-id=163 bgcolor=#E9E9E9
| 238163 ||  || — || September 18, 2003 || Socorro || LINEAR || MRX || align=right | 1.6 km || 
|-id=164 bgcolor=#E9E9E9
| 238164 ||  || — || September 17, 2003 || Campo Imperatore || CINEOS || — || align=right | 1.9 km || 
|-id=165 bgcolor=#fefefe
| 238165 ||  || — || September 19, 2003 || Palomar || NEAT || H || align=right | 1.1 km || 
|-id=166 bgcolor=#d6d6d6
| 238166 ||  || — || September 18, 2003 || Palomar || NEAT || CHA || align=right | 3.1 km || 
|-id=167 bgcolor=#fefefe
| 238167 ||  || — || September 20, 2003 || Kitt Peak || Spacewatch || — || align=right data-sort-value="0.80" | 800 m || 
|-id=168 bgcolor=#E9E9E9
| 238168 ||  || — || September 19, 2003 || Palomar || NEAT || HNS || align=right | 2.0 km || 
|-id=169 bgcolor=#E9E9E9
| 238169 ||  || — || September 16, 2003 || Socorro || LINEAR || EUN || align=right | 1.6 km || 
|-id=170 bgcolor=#d6d6d6
| 238170 ||  || — || September 16, 2003 || Kitt Peak || Spacewatch || — || align=right | 3.8 km || 
|-id=171 bgcolor=#E9E9E9
| 238171 ||  || — || September 17, 2003 || Socorro || LINEAR || — || align=right | 1.7 km || 
|-id=172 bgcolor=#fefefe
| 238172 ||  || — || September 23, 2003 || Haleakala || NEAT || — || align=right | 1.1 km || 
|-id=173 bgcolor=#E9E9E9
| 238173 ||  || — || September 18, 2003 || Kitt Peak || Spacewatch || — || align=right | 2.0 km || 
|-id=174 bgcolor=#E9E9E9
| 238174 ||  || — || September 18, 2003 || Palomar || NEAT || — || align=right | 1.3 km || 
|-id=175 bgcolor=#E9E9E9
| 238175 ||  || — || September 22, 2003 || Anderson Mesa || LONEOS || — || align=right | 1.9 km || 
|-id=176 bgcolor=#fefefe
| 238176 ||  || — || September 25, 2003 || Palomar || NEAT || — || align=right | 1.4 km || 
|-id=177 bgcolor=#E9E9E9
| 238177 ||  || — || September 24, 2003 || Socorro || LINEAR || — || align=right | 4.1 km || 
|-id=178 bgcolor=#E9E9E9
| 238178 ||  || — || September 27, 2003 || Kitt Peak || Spacewatch || — || align=right | 2.5 km || 
|-id=179 bgcolor=#E9E9E9
| 238179 ||  || — || September 28, 2003 || Desert Eagle || W. K. Y. Yeung || ADE || align=right | 3.4 km || 
|-id=180 bgcolor=#E9E9E9
| 238180 ||  || — || September 28, 2003 || Desert Eagle || W. K. Y. Yeung || — || align=right | 2.2 km || 
|-id=181 bgcolor=#E9E9E9
| 238181 ||  || — || September 26, 2003 || Socorro || LINEAR || fast? || align=right | 2.4 km || 
|-id=182 bgcolor=#E9E9E9
| 238182 ||  || — || September 26, 2003 || Socorro || LINEAR || — || align=right | 2.8 km || 
|-id=183 bgcolor=#fefefe
| 238183 ||  || — || September 27, 2003 || Socorro || LINEAR || H || align=right | 1.0 km || 
|-id=184 bgcolor=#E9E9E9
| 238184 ||  || — || September 28, 2003 || Socorro || LINEAR || — || align=right | 2.5 km || 
|-id=185 bgcolor=#E9E9E9
| 238185 ||  || — || September 28, 2003 || Kitt Peak || Spacewatch || NEM || align=right | 3.0 km || 
|-id=186 bgcolor=#E9E9E9
| 238186 ||  || — || September 29, 2003 || Kitt Peak || Spacewatch || — || align=right | 2.5 km || 
|-id=187 bgcolor=#E9E9E9
| 238187 ||  || — || September 24, 2003 || Haleakala || NEAT || MAR || align=right | 1.9 km || 
|-id=188 bgcolor=#E9E9E9
| 238188 ||  || — || September 17, 2003 || Kitt Peak || Spacewatch || NEM || align=right | 3.3 km || 
|-id=189 bgcolor=#E9E9E9
| 238189 ||  || — || September 29, 2003 || Kitt Peak || Spacewatch || — || align=right | 1.2 km || 
|-id=190 bgcolor=#E9E9E9
| 238190 ||  || — || September 27, 2003 || Socorro || LINEAR || GER || align=right | 2.5 km || 
|-id=191 bgcolor=#E9E9E9
| 238191 ||  || — || September 28, 2003 || Socorro || LINEAR || — || align=right | 2.5 km || 
|-id=192 bgcolor=#E9E9E9
| 238192 ||  || — || September 26, 2003 || Apache Point || SDSS || ADE || align=right | 2.3 km || 
|-id=193 bgcolor=#E9E9E9
| 238193 ||  || — || September 19, 2003 || Campo Imperatore || CINEOS || — || align=right | 2.5 km || 
|-id=194 bgcolor=#E9E9E9
| 238194 ||  || — || September 26, 2003 || Apache Point || SDSS || EUN || align=right | 1.4 km || 
|-id=195 bgcolor=#E9E9E9
| 238195 ||  || — || September 18, 2003 || Kitt Peak || Spacewatch || WIT || align=right | 1.2 km || 
|-id=196 bgcolor=#fefefe
| 238196 ||  || — || September 20, 2003 || Anderson Mesa || LONEOS || H || align=right data-sort-value="0.94" | 940 m || 
|-id=197 bgcolor=#E9E9E9
| 238197 ||  || — || September 22, 2003 || Kitt Peak || Spacewatch || — || align=right | 2.1 km || 
|-id=198 bgcolor=#E9E9E9
| 238198 ||  || — || September 26, 2003 || Apache Point || SDSS || — || align=right | 3.2 km || 
|-id=199 bgcolor=#E9E9E9
| 238199 ||  || — || September 19, 2003 || Kitt Peak || Spacewatch || — || align=right | 1.1 km || 
|-id=200 bgcolor=#d6d6d6
| 238200 ||  || — || October 1, 2003 || Kitt Peak || Spacewatch || — || align=right | 4.8 km || 
|}

238201–238300 

|-bgcolor=#E9E9E9
| 238201 ||  || — || October 15, 2003 || Anderson Mesa || LONEOS || HNS || align=right | 1.6 km || 
|-id=202 bgcolor=#E9E9E9
| 238202 ||  || — || October 5, 2003 || Kitt Peak || Spacewatch || HOF || align=right | 3.5 km || 
|-id=203 bgcolor=#E9E9E9
| 238203 ||  || — || October 5, 2003 || Kitt Peak || Spacewatch || WIT || align=right | 1.3 km || 
|-id=204 bgcolor=#E9E9E9
| 238204 ||  || — || October 2, 2003 || Kitt Peak || Spacewatch || — || align=right | 1.4 km || 
|-id=205 bgcolor=#fefefe
| 238205 ||  || — || October 20, 2003 || Socorro || LINEAR || H || align=right data-sort-value="0.87" | 870 m || 
|-id=206 bgcolor=#E9E9E9
| 238206 ||  || — || October 23, 2003 || Kvistaberg || UDAS || — || align=right | 2.9 km || 
|-id=207 bgcolor=#E9E9E9
| 238207 ||  || — || October 16, 2003 || Kitt Peak || Spacewatch || — || align=right | 3.1 km || 
|-id=208 bgcolor=#E9E9E9
| 238208 ||  || — || October 17, 2003 || Kitt Peak || Spacewatch || — || align=right | 2.2 km || 
|-id=209 bgcolor=#E9E9E9
| 238209 ||  || — || October 16, 2003 || Anderson Mesa || LONEOS || — || align=right | 3.1 km || 
|-id=210 bgcolor=#d6d6d6
| 238210 ||  || — || October 18, 2003 || Palomar || NEAT || TRP || align=right | 4.2 km || 
|-id=211 bgcolor=#E9E9E9
| 238211 ||  || — || October 16, 2003 || Kitt Peak || Spacewatch || — || align=right | 2.6 km || 
|-id=212 bgcolor=#E9E9E9
| 238212 ||  || — || October 19, 2003 || Socorro || LINEAR || — || align=right | 4.1 km || 
|-id=213 bgcolor=#E9E9E9
| 238213 ||  || — || October 17, 2003 || Kitt Peak || Spacewatch || HOF || align=right | 3.5 km || 
|-id=214 bgcolor=#d6d6d6
| 238214 ||  || — || October 18, 2003 || Haleakala || NEAT || EUP || align=right | 7.2 km || 
|-id=215 bgcolor=#E9E9E9
| 238215 ||  || — || October 18, 2003 || Palomar || NEAT || — || align=right | 2.3 km || 
|-id=216 bgcolor=#E9E9E9
| 238216 ||  || — || October 18, 2003 || Palomar || NEAT || — || align=right | 1.7 km || 
|-id=217 bgcolor=#E9E9E9
| 238217 ||  || — || October 20, 2003 || Kitt Peak || Spacewatch || — || align=right | 2.9 km || 
|-id=218 bgcolor=#E9E9E9
| 238218 ||  || — || October 20, 2003 || Palomar || NEAT || EUN || align=right | 1.5 km || 
|-id=219 bgcolor=#E9E9E9
| 238219 ||  || — || October 19, 2003 || Kitt Peak || Spacewatch || — || align=right | 4.0 km || 
|-id=220 bgcolor=#d6d6d6
| 238220 ||  || — || October 20, 2003 || Socorro || LINEAR || — || align=right | 4.4 km || 
|-id=221 bgcolor=#d6d6d6
| 238221 ||  || — || October 17, 2003 || Palomar || NEAT || — || align=right | 4.7 km || 
|-id=222 bgcolor=#E9E9E9
| 238222 ||  || — || October 21, 2003 || Socorro || LINEAR || AGN || align=right | 1.6 km || 
|-id=223 bgcolor=#E9E9E9
| 238223 ||  || — || October 18, 2003 || Anderson Mesa || LONEOS || RAF || align=right | 1.4 km || 
|-id=224 bgcolor=#E9E9E9
| 238224 ||  || — || October 19, 2003 || Kitt Peak || Spacewatch || — || align=right | 2.0 km || 
|-id=225 bgcolor=#E9E9E9
| 238225 ||  || — || October 20, 2003 || Socorro || LINEAR || HNS || align=right | 1.7 km || 
|-id=226 bgcolor=#E9E9E9
| 238226 ||  || — || October 21, 2003 || Socorro || LINEAR || GEF || align=right | 2.2 km || 
|-id=227 bgcolor=#E9E9E9
| 238227 ||  || — || October 21, 2003 || Kitt Peak || Spacewatch || — || align=right | 1.8 km || 
|-id=228 bgcolor=#d6d6d6
| 238228 ||  || — || October 21, 2003 || Palomar || NEAT || — || align=right | 3.0 km || 
|-id=229 bgcolor=#E9E9E9
| 238229 ||  || — || October 21, 2003 || Palomar || NEAT || — || align=right | 1.2 km || 
|-id=230 bgcolor=#d6d6d6
| 238230 ||  || — || October 21, 2003 || Socorro || LINEAR || — || align=right | 3.9 km || 
|-id=231 bgcolor=#E9E9E9
| 238231 ||  || — || October 22, 2003 || Socorro || LINEAR || — || align=right | 3.7 km || 
|-id=232 bgcolor=#d6d6d6
| 238232 ||  || — || October 21, 2003 || Kitt Peak || Spacewatch || THM || align=right | 3.1 km || 
|-id=233 bgcolor=#E9E9E9
| 238233 ||  || — || October 21, 2003 || Kitt Peak || Spacewatch || AER || align=right | 2.0 km || 
|-id=234 bgcolor=#E9E9E9
| 238234 ||  || — || October 22, 2003 || Kitt Peak || Spacewatch || — || align=right | 1.3 km || 
|-id=235 bgcolor=#E9E9E9
| 238235 ||  || — || October 22, 2003 || Socorro || LINEAR || — || align=right | 4.3 km || 
|-id=236 bgcolor=#E9E9E9
| 238236 ||  || — || October 21, 2003 || Socorro || LINEAR || WIT || align=right | 1.6 km || 
|-id=237 bgcolor=#E9E9E9
| 238237 ||  || — || October 22, 2003 || Kitt Peak || Spacewatch || EUN || align=right | 2.1 km || 
|-id=238 bgcolor=#fefefe
| 238238 ||  || — || October 22, 2003 || Socorro || LINEAR || H || align=right | 1.2 km || 
|-id=239 bgcolor=#E9E9E9
| 238239 ||  || — || October 22, 2003 || Kitt Peak || Spacewatch || — || align=right | 2.9 km || 
|-id=240 bgcolor=#E9E9E9
| 238240 ||  || — || October 23, 2003 || Anderson Mesa || LONEOS || — || align=right | 1.6 km || 
|-id=241 bgcolor=#E9E9E9
| 238241 ||  || — || October 24, 2003 || Socorro || LINEAR || — || align=right | 2.2 km || 
|-id=242 bgcolor=#d6d6d6
| 238242 ||  || — || October 25, 2003 || Socorro || LINEAR || URS || align=right | 5.6 km || 
|-id=243 bgcolor=#E9E9E9
| 238243 ||  || — || October 25, 2003 || Socorro || LINEAR || GEF || align=right | 3.8 km || 
|-id=244 bgcolor=#E9E9E9
| 238244 ||  || — || October 25, 2003 || Kitt Peak || Spacewatch || — || align=right | 2.2 km || 
|-id=245 bgcolor=#E9E9E9
| 238245 ||  || — || October 26, 2003 || Kitt Peak || Spacewatch || — || align=right | 1.9 km || 
|-id=246 bgcolor=#E9E9E9
| 238246 ||  || — || October 27, 2003 || Socorro || LINEAR || — || align=right | 1.3 km || 
|-id=247 bgcolor=#E9E9E9
| 238247 ||  || — || October 29, 2003 || Socorro || LINEAR || NEM || align=right | 3.2 km || 
|-id=248 bgcolor=#E9E9E9
| 238248 ||  || — || October 30, 2003 || Socorro || LINEAR || — || align=right | 4.4 km || 
|-id=249 bgcolor=#E9E9E9
| 238249 ||  || — || October 26, 2003 || Kitt Peak || Spacewatch || — || align=right | 2.8 km || 
|-id=250 bgcolor=#E9E9E9
| 238250 ||  || — || October 16, 2003 || Kitt Peak || Spacewatch || — || align=right | 2.4 km || 
|-id=251 bgcolor=#E9E9E9
| 238251 ||  || — || October 16, 2003 || Palomar || NEAT || — || align=right | 2.9 km || 
|-id=252 bgcolor=#E9E9E9
| 238252 ||  || — || October 19, 2003 || Kitt Peak || Spacewatch || — || align=right | 3.2 km || 
|-id=253 bgcolor=#E9E9E9
| 238253 ||  || — || October 19, 2003 || Kitt Peak || Spacewatch || — || align=right | 1.2 km || 
|-id=254 bgcolor=#E9E9E9
| 238254 ||  || — || October 20, 2003 || Kitt Peak || Spacewatch || — || align=right | 2.2 km || 
|-id=255 bgcolor=#E9E9E9
| 238255 ||  || — || November 15, 2003 || Kitt Peak || Spacewatch || — || align=right | 1.7 km || 
|-id=256 bgcolor=#d6d6d6
| 238256 ||  || — || November 15, 2003 || Kitt Peak || Spacewatch || — || align=right | 3.1 km || 
|-id=257 bgcolor=#E9E9E9
| 238257 || 2003 WO || — || November 16, 2003 || Catalina || CSS || ADE || align=right | 3.5 km || 
|-id=258 bgcolor=#E9E9E9
| 238258 ||  || — || November 16, 2003 || Kitt Peak || Spacewatch || — || align=right | 1.9 km || 
|-id=259 bgcolor=#E9E9E9
| 238259 ||  || — || November 16, 2003 || Kitt Peak || Spacewatch || — || align=right | 2.9 km || 
|-id=260 bgcolor=#d6d6d6
| 238260 ||  || — || November 16, 2003 || Kitt Peak || Spacewatch || — || align=right | 4.1 km || 
|-id=261 bgcolor=#d6d6d6
| 238261 ||  || — || November 18, 2003 || Kitt Peak || Spacewatch || — || align=right | 3.3 km || 
|-id=262 bgcolor=#d6d6d6
| 238262 ||  || — || November 19, 2003 || Socorro || LINEAR || — || align=right | 5.2 km || 
|-id=263 bgcolor=#E9E9E9
| 238263 ||  || — || November 18, 2003 || Kitt Peak || Spacewatch || — || align=right | 2.4 km || 
|-id=264 bgcolor=#E9E9E9
| 238264 ||  || — || November 18, 2003 || Kitt Peak || Spacewatch || KRM || align=right | 3.3 km || 
|-id=265 bgcolor=#E9E9E9
| 238265 ||  || — || November 19, 2003 || Palomar || NEAT || — || align=right | 2.4 km || 
|-id=266 bgcolor=#E9E9E9
| 238266 ||  || — || November 18, 2003 || Palomar || NEAT || WIT || align=right | 1.3 km || 
|-id=267 bgcolor=#E9E9E9
| 238267 ||  || — || November 19, 2003 || Kitt Peak || Spacewatch || — || align=right | 1.8 km || 
|-id=268 bgcolor=#E9E9E9
| 238268 ||  || — || November 18, 2003 || Kitt Peak || Spacewatch || — || align=right | 2.8 km || 
|-id=269 bgcolor=#d6d6d6
| 238269 ||  || — || November 19, 2003 || Kitt Peak || Spacewatch || — || align=right | 3.5 km || 
|-id=270 bgcolor=#E9E9E9
| 238270 ||  || — || November 19, 2003 || Kitt Peak || Spacewatch || — || align=right | 3.8 km || 
|-id=271 bgcolor=#E9E9E9
| 238271 ||  || — || November 19, 2003 || Kitt Peak || Spacewatch || — || align=right | 2.4 km || 
|-id=272 bgcolor=#E9E9E9
| 238272 ||  || — || November 19, 2003 || Kitt Peak || Spacewatch || GER || align=right | 3.2 km || 
|-id=273 bgcolor=#E9E9E9
| 238273 ||  || — || November 20, 2003 || Socorro || LINEAR || INO || align=right | 1.7 km || 
|-id=274 bgcolor=#E9E9E9
| 238274 ||  || — || November 20, 2003 || Socorro || LINEAR || EUN || align=right | 2.2 km || 
|-id=275 bgcolor=#d6d6d6
| 238275 ||  || — || November 19, 2003 || Palomar || NEAT || — || align=right | 4.0 km || 
|-id=276 bgcolor=#E9E9E9
| 238276 ||  || — || November 16, 2003 || Catalina || CSS || AGN || align=right | 1.7 km || 
|-id=277 bgcolor=#E9E9E9
| 238277 ||  || — || November 19, 2003 || Anderson Mesa || LONEOS || — || align=right | 3.0 km || 
|-id=278 bgcolor=#E9E9E9
| 238278 ||  || — || November 19, 2003 || Anderson Mesa || LONEOS || — || align=right | 3.1 km || 
|-id=279 bgcolor=#d6d6d6
| 238279 ||  || — || November 20, 2003 || Socorro || LINEAR || — || align=right | 4.1 km || 
|-id=280 bgcolor=#d6d6d6
| 238280 ||  || — || November 21, 2003 || Socorro || LINEAR || EUP || align=right | 6.0 km || 
|-id=281 bgcolor=#E9E9E9
| 238281 ||  || — || November 20, 2003 || Socorro || LINEAR || AGN || align=right | 1.8 km || 
|-id=282 bgcolor=#d6d6d6
| 238282 ||  || — || November 20, 2003 || Socorro || LINEAR || — || align=right | 3.9 km || 
|-id=283 bgcolor=#d6d6d6
| 238283 ||  || — || November 20, 2003 || Socorro || LINEAR || EUP || align=right | 6.5 km || 
|-id=284 bgcolor=#fefefe
| 238284 ||  || — || November 20, 2003 || Socorro || LINEAR || H || align=right | 1.4 km || 
|-id=285 bgcolor=#E9E9E9
| 238285 ||  || — || November 21, 2003 || Socorro || LINEAR || HEN || align=right | 1.5 km || 
|-id=286 bgcolor=#E9E9E9
| 238286 ||  || — || November 21, 2003 || Socorro || LINEAR || — || align=right | 3.6 km || 
|-id=287 bgcolor=#E9E9E9
| 238287 ||  || — || November 21, 2003 || Socorro || LINEAR || AER || align=right | 3.1 km || 
|-id=288 bgcolor=#E9E9E9
| 238288 ||  || — || November 21, 2003 || Socorro || LINEAR || — || align=right | 2.3 km || 
|-id=289 bgcolor=#E9E9E9
| 238289 ||  || — || November 23, 2003 || Kitt Peak || Spacewatch || GEF || align=right | 1.7 km || 
|-id=290 bgcolor=#E9E9E9
| 238290 ||  || — || November 24, 2003 || Anderson Mesa || LONEOS || PAD || align=right | 3.5 km || 
|-id=291 bgcolor=#E9E9E9
| 238291 ||  || — || November 24, 2003 || Anderson Mesa || LONEOS || HOF || align=right | 4.1 km || 
|-id=292 bgcolor=#E9E9E9
| 238292 ||  || — || November 26, 2003 || Kitt Peak || Spacewatch || — || align=right | 4.0 km || 
|-id=293 bgcolor=#d6d6d6
| 238293 ||  || — || November 26, 2003 || Kitt Peak || Spacewatch || — || align=right | 5.0 km || 
|-id=294 bgcolor=#E9E9E9
| 238294 ||  || — || November 28, 2003 || Kitt Peak || Spacewatch || NEM || align=right | 2.6 km || 
|-id=295 bgcolor=#d6d6d6
| 238295 ||  || — || November 30, 2003 || Kitt Peak || Spacewatch || — || align=right | 2.7 km || 
|-id=296 bgcolor=#E9E9E9
| 238296 ||  || — || November 30, 2003 || Kitt Peak || Spacewatch || — || align=right | 2.9 km || 
|-id=297 bgcolor=#d6d6d6
| 238297 ||  || — || November 30, 2003 || Kitt Peak || Spacewatch || — || align=right | 3.5 km || 
|-id=298 bgcolor=#E9E9E9
| 238298 ||  || — || November 19, 2003 || Kitt Peak || Spacewatch || HEN || align=right | 1.3 km || 
|-id=299 bgcolor=#d6d6d6
| 238299 ||  || — || December 4, 2003 || Socorro || LINEAR || — || align=right | 6.3 km || 
|-id=300 bgcolor=#d6d6d6
| 238300 ||  || — || December 13, 2003 || Socorro || LINEAR || — || align=right | 2.9 km || 
|}

238301–238400 

|-bgcolor=#d6d6d6
| 238301 ||  || — || December 3, 2003 || Socorro || LINEAR || — || align=right | 4.7 km || 
|-id=302 bgcolor=#d6d6d6
| 238302 ||  || — || December 14, 2003 || Kitt Peak || Spacewatch || — || align=right | 4.1 km || 
|-id=303 bgcolor=#d6d6d6
| 238303 ||  || — || December 1, 2003 || Kitt Peak || Spacewatch || — || align=right | 4.6 km || 
|-id=304 bgcolor=#d6d6d6
| 238304 ||  || — || December 1, 2003 || Socorro || LINEAR || — || align=right | 3.6 km || 
|-id=305 bgcolor=#d6d6d6
| 238305 ||  || — || December 1, 2003 || Kitt Peak || Spacewatch || — || align=right | 4.6 km || 
|-id=306 bgcolor=#E9E9E9
| 238306 ||  || — || December 1, 2003 || Kitt Peak || Spacewatch || — || align=right | 2.4 km || 
|-id=307 bgcolor=#fefefe
| 238307 ||  || — || December 18, 2003 || Socorro || LINEAR || H || align=right data-sort-value="0.89" | 890 m || 
|-id=308 bgcolor=#d6d6d6
| 238308 ||  || — || December 17, 2003 || Socorro || LINEAR || — || align=right | 3.7 km || 
|-id=309 bgcolor=#d6d6d6
| 238309 ||  || — || December 17, 2003 || Kitt Peak || Spacewatch || EUP || align=right | 6.3 km || 
|-id=310 bgcolor=#E9E9E9
| 238310 ||  || — || December 17, 2003 || Kitt Peak || Spacewatch || — || align=right | 2.4 km || 
|-id=311 bgcolor=#d6d6d6
| 238311 ||  || — || December 19, 2003 || Kitt Peak || Spacewatch || — || align=right | 5.7 km || 
|-id=312 bgcolor=#d6d6d6
| 238312 ||  || — || December 19, 2003 || Kitt Peak || Spacewatch || — || align=right | 2.7 km || 
|-id=313 bgcolor=#E9E9E9
| 238313 ||  || — || December 19, 2003 || Socorro || LINEAR || — || align=right | 1.6 km || 
|-id=314 bgcolor=#d6d6d6
| 238314 ||  || — || December 19, 2003 || Socorro || LINEAR || — || align=right | 3.7 km || 
|-id=315 bgcolor=#d6d6d6
| 238315 ||  || — || December 21, 2003 || Socorro || LINEAR || — || align=right | 4.8 km || 
|-id=316 bgcolor=#d6d6d6
| 238316 ||  || — || December 18, 2003 || Socorro || LINEAR || — || align=right | 3.7 km || 
|-id=317 bgcolor=#d6d6d6
| 238317 ||  || — || December 19, 2003 || Socorro || LINEAR || — || align=right | 4.6 km || 
|-id=318 bgcolor=#d6d6d6
| 238318 ||  || — || December 27, 2003 || Socorro || LINEAR || — || align=right | 6.8 km || 
|-id=319 bgcolor=#E9E9E9
| 238319 ||  || — || December 28, 2003 || Socorro || LINEAR || — || align=right | 1.8 km || 
|-id=320 bgcolor=#d6d6d6
| 238320 ||  || — || December 28, 2003 || Socorro || LINEAR || EOS || align=right | 2.6 km || 
|-id=321 bgcolor=#E9E9E9
| 238321 ||  || — || December 28, 2003 || Socorro || LINEAR || EUN || align=right | 2.4 km || 
|-id=322 bgcolor=#d6d6d6
| 238322 ||  || — || December 29, 2003 || Socorro || LINEAR || — || align=right | 3.1 km || 
|-id=323 bgcolor=#d6d6d6
| 238323 ||  || — || December 29, 2003 || Catalina || CSS || — || align=right | 4.1 km || 
|-id=324 bgcolor=#d6d6d6
| 238324 ||  || — || December 17, 2003 || Kitt Peak || Spacewatch || — || align=right | 3.0 km || 
|-id=325 bgcolor=#d6d6d6
| 238325 ||  || — || December 19, 2003 || Kitt Peak || Spacewatch || — || align=right | 2.3 km || 
|-id=326 bgcolor=#d6d6d6
| 238326 ||  || — || January 13, 2004 || Anderson Mesa || LONEOS || — || align=right | 3.6 km || 
|-id=327 bgcolor=#d6d6d6
| 238327 ||  || — || January 15, 2004 || Kitt Peak || Spacewatch || — || align=right | 2.4 km || 
|-id=328 bgcolor=#d6d6d6
| 238328 ||  || — || January 15, 2004 || Kitt Peak || Spacewatch || — || align=right | 4.0 km || 
|-id=329 bgcolor=#d6d6d6
| 238329 ||  || — || January 16, 2004 || Palomar || NEAT || — || align=right | 3.6 km || 
|-id=330 bgcolor=#d6d6d6
| 238330 ||  || — || January 16, 2004 || Palomar || NEAT || — || align=right | 4.1 km || 
|-id=331 bgcolor=#d6d6d6
| 238331 ||  || — || January 16, 2004 || Catalina || CSS || LIX || align=right | 3.9 km || 
|-id=332 bgcolor=#d6d6d6
| 238332 ||  || — || January 18, 2004 || Palomar || NEAT || — || align=right | 3.6 km || 
|-id=333 bgcolor=#d6d6d6
| 238333 ||  || — || January 16, 2004 || Kitt Peak || Spacewatch || — || align=right | 2.8 km || 
|-id=334 bgcolor=#d6d6d6
| 238334 ||  || — || January 19, 2004 || Kitt Peak || Spacewatch || THM || align=right | 2.4 km || 
|-id=335 bgcolor=#d6d6d6
| 238335 ||  || — || January 21, 2004 || Socorro || LINEAR || — || align=right | 3.7 km || 
|-id=336 bgcolor=#d6d6d6
| 238336 ||  || — || January 23, 2004 || Socorro || LINEAR || — || align=right | 2.5 km || 
|-id=337 bgcolor=#d6d6d6
| 238337 ||  || — || January 23, 2004 || Socorro || LINEAR || — || align=right | 5.5 km || 
|-id=338 bgcolor=#d6d6d6
| 238338 ||  || — || January 24, 2004 || Socorro || LINEAR || EMA || align=right | 4.8 km || 
|-id=339 bgcolor=#d6d6d6
| 238339 ||  || — || January 22, 2004 || Socorro || LINEAR || EOS || align=right | 2.7 km || 
|-id=340 bgcolor=#d6d6d6
| 238340 ||  || — || January 22, 2004 || Socorro || LINEAR || THM || align=right | 3.0 km || 
|-id=341 bgcolor=#d6d6d6
| 238341 ||  || — || January 26, 2004 || Anderson Mesa || LONEOS || — || align=right | 3.9 km || 
|-id=342 bgcolor=#d6d6d6
| 238342 ||  || — || January 22, 2004 || Socorro || LINEAR || THM || align=right | 5.1 km || 
|-id=343 bgcolor=#d6d6d6
| 238343 ||  || — || January 23, 2004 || Anderson Mesa || LONEOS || TIR || align=right | 4.5 km || 
|-id=344 bgcolor=#d6d6d6
| 238344 ||  || — || January 31, 2004 || Socorro || LINEAR || EUP || align=right | 5.1 km || 
|-id=345 bgcolor=#d6d6d6
| 238345 ||  || — || January 26, 2004 || Anderson Mesa || LONEOS || LIX || align=right | 5.0 km || 
|-id=346 bgcolor=#d6d6d6
| 238346 ||  || — || January 28, 2004 || Catalina || CSS || LIX || align=right | 5.7 km || 
|-id=347 bgcolor=#d6d6d6
| 238347 ||  || — || January 28, 2004 || Catalina || CSS || — || align=right | 4.2 km || 
|-id=348 bgcolor=#d6d6d6
| 238348 ||  || — || January 28, 2004 || Catalina || CSS || LIX || align=right | 5.1 km || 
|-id=349 bgcolor=#d6d6d6
| 238349 ||  || — || January 29, 2004 || Catalina || CSS || Tj (2.92) || align=right | 6.5 km || 
|-id=350 bgcolor=#d6d6d6
| 238350 ||  || — || January 28, 2004 || Catalina || CSS || — || align=right | 5.3 km || 
|-id=351 bgcolor=#d6d6d6
| 238351 ||  || — || January 27, 2004 || Catalina || CSS || — || align=right | 3.5 km || 
|-id=352 bgcolor=#d6d6d6
| 238352 ||  || — || January 29, 2004 || Socorro || LINEAR || EUP || align=right | 5.1 km || 
|-id=353 bgcolor=#d6d6d6
| 238353 ||  || — || January 30, 2004 || Catalina || CSS || — || align=right | 5.5 km || 
|-id=354 bgcolor=#d6d6d6
| 238354 ||  || — || January 17, 2004 || Palomar || NEAT || — || align=right | 5.7 km || 
|-id=355 bgcolor=#d6d6d6
| 238355 ||  || — || January 17, 2004 || Palomar || NEAT || TIR || align=right | 2.8 km || 
|-id=356 bgcolor=#d6d6d6
| 238356 ||  || — || February 10, 2004 || Palomar || NEAT || EOS || align=right | 2.9 km || 
|-id=357 bgcolor=#d6d6d6
| 238357 ||  || — || February 10, 2004 || Palomar || NEAT || EOS || align=right | 2.9 km || 
|-id=358 bgcolor=#d6d6d6
| 238358 ||  || — || February 10, 2004 || Catalina || CSS || — || align=right | 4.2 km || 
|-id=359 bgcolor=#d6d6d6
| 238359 ||  || — || February 11, 2004 || Kitt Peak || Spacewatch || — || align=right | 2.2 km || 
|-id=360 bgcolor=#d6d6d6
| 238360 ||  || — || February 12, 2004 || Kitt Peak || Spacewatch || — || align=right | 2.7 km || 
|-id=361 bgcolor=#d6d6d6
| 238361 ||  || — || February 12, 2004 || Desert Eagle || W. K. Y. Yeung || — || align=right | 5.8 km || 
|-id=362 bgcolor=#d6d6d6
| 238362 ||  || — || February 11, 2004 || Palomar || NEAT || — || align=right | 3.4 km || 
|-id=363 bgcolor=#d6d6d6
| 238363 ||  || — || February 11, 2004 || Palomar || NEAT || — || align=right | 2.6 km || 
|-id=364 bgcolor=#d6d6d6
| 238364 ||  || — || February 13, 2004 || Kitt Peak || Spacewatch || — || align=right | 3.0 km || 
|-id=365 bgcolor=#d6d6d6
| 238365 ||  || — || February 14, 2004 || Socorro || LINEAR || Tj (2.94) || align=right | 3.4 km || 
|-id=366 bgcolor=#d6d6d6
| 238366 ||  || — || February 13, 2004 || Palomar || NEAT || — || align=right | 6.1 km || 
|-id=367 bgcolor=#d6d6d6
| 238367 ||  || — || February 10, 2004 || Catalina || CSS || HYG || align=right | 3.9 km || 
|-id=368 bgcolor=#d6d6d6
| 238368 ||  || — || February 10, 2004 || Palomar || NEAT || EUP || align=right | 5.8 km || 
|-id=369 bgcolor=#d6d6d6
| 238369 ||  || — || February 10, 2004 || Palomar || NEAT || — || align=right | 3.8 km || 
|-id=370 bgcolor=#d6d6d6
| 238370 ||  || — || February 11, 2004 || Palomar || NEAT || — || align=right | 3.5 km || 
|-id=371 bgcolor=#d6d6d6
| 238371 ||  || — || February 12, 2004 || Palomar || NEAT || LIX || align=right | 4.7 km || 
|-id=372 bgcolor=#d6d6d6
| 238372 ||  || — || February 14, 2004 || Haleakala || NEAT || — || align=right | 4.4 km || 
|-id=373 bgcolor=#d6d6d6
| 238373 ||  || — || February 10, 2004 || Palomar || NEAT || — || align=right | 4.3 km || 
|-id=374 bgcolor=#d6d6d6
| 238374 ||  || — || February 10, 2004 || Palomar || NEAT || — || align=right | 2.8 km || 
|-id=375 bgcolor=#d6d6d6
| 238375 ||  || — || February 12, 2004 || Kitt Peak || Spacewatch || — || align=right | 3.0 km || 
|-id=376 bgcolor=#d6d6d6
| 238376 ||  || — || February 14, 2004 || Kitt Peak || Spacewatch || — || align=right | 3.8 km || 
|-id=377 bgcolor=#d6d6d6
| 238377 ||  || — || February 11, 2004 || Palomar || NEAT || — || align=right | 3.8 km || 
|-id=378 bgcolor=#d6d6d6
| 238378 ||  || — || February 14, 2004 || Catalina || CSS || — || align=right | 4.2 km || 
|-id=379 bgcolor=#d6d6d6
| 238379 ||  || — || February 15, 2004 || Catalina || CSS || TIR || align=right | 4.9 km || 
|-id=380 bgcolor=#d6d6d6
| 238380 ||  || — || February 12, 2004 || Palomar || NEAT || HYG || align=right | 4.4 km || 
|-id=381 bgcolor=#d6d6d6
| 238381 ||  || — || February 14, 2004 || Palomar || NEAT || — || align=right | 5.6 km || 
|-id=382 bgcolor=#d6d6d6
| 238382 ||  || — || February 15, 2004 || Catalina || CSS || — || align=right | 5.6 km || 
|-id=383 bgcolor=#d6d6d6
| 238383 ||  || — || February 11, 2004 || Socorro || LINEAR || EUP || align=right | 6.2 km || 
|-id=384 bgcolor=#d6d6d6
| 238384 ||  || — || February 12, 2004 || Kitt Peak || Spacewatch || — || align=right | 3.6 km || 
|-id=385 bgcolor=#d6d6d6
| 238385 ||  || — || February 16, 2004 || Catalina || CSS || — || align=right | 4.8 km || 
|-id=386 bgcolor=#d6d6d6
| 238386 ||  || — || February 19, 2004 || Socorro || LINEAR || — || align=right | 4.3 km || 
|-id=387 bgcolor=#d6d6d6
| 238387 ||  || — || February 22, 2004 || Kitt Peak || Spacewatch || EOS || align=right | 2.8 km || 
|-id=388 bgcolor=#d6d6d6
| 238388 ||  || — || February 23, 2004 || Socorro || LINEAR || — || align=right | 4.1 km || 
|-id=389 bgcolor=#d6d6d6
| 238389 ||  || — || February 22, 2004 || Kitt Peak || Spacewatch || THM || align=right | 2.4 km || 
|-id=390 bgcolor=#d6d6d6
| 238390 ||  || — || February 21, 2004 || Haleakala || NEAT || — || align=right | 4.4 km || 
|-id=391 bgcolor=#d6d6d6
| 238391 ||  || — || February 16, 2004 || Catalina || CSS || — || align=right | 3.5 km || 
|-id=392 bgcolor=#d6d6d6
| 238392 ||  || — || February 22, 2004 || Kitt Peak || Spacewatch || VER || align=right | 4.1 km || 
|-id=393 bgcolor=#d6d6d6
| 238393 ||  || — || March 9, 2004 || Palomar || NEAT || — || align=right | 4.2 km || 
|-id=394 bgcolor=#d6d6d6
| 238394 ||  || — || March 10, 2004 || Palomar || NEAT || — || align=right | 5.3 km || 
|-id=395 bgcolor=#d6d6d6
| 238395 ||  || — || March 11, 2004 || Palomar || NEAT || EOS || align=right | 2.7 km || 
|-id=396 bgcolor=#d6d6d6
| 238396 ||  || — || March 10, 2004 || Socorro || LINEAR || EUP || align=right | 5.0 km || 
|-id=397 bgcolor=#d6d6d6
| 238397 ||  || — || March 14, 2004 || Socorro || LINEAR || EUP || align=right | 4.6 km || 
|-id=398 bgcolor=#d6d6d6
| 238398 ||  || — || March 14, 2004 || Socorro || LINEAR || — || align=right | 6.3 km || 
|-id=399 bgcolor=#d6d6d6
| 238399 ||  || — || March 11, 2004 || Palomar || NEAT || THM || align=right | 3.7 km || 
|-id=400 bgcolor=#d6d6d6
| 238400 ||  || — || March 11, 2004 || Palomar || NEAT || — || align=right | 4.9 km || 
|}

238401–238500 

|-bgcolor=#d6d6d6
| 238401 ||  || — || March 12, 2004 || Palomar || NEAT || TIR || align=right | 2.5 km || 
|-id=402 bgcolor=#d6d6d6
| 238402 ||  || — || March 14, 2004 || Kitt Peak || Spacewatch || VER || align=right | 4.2 km || 
|-id=403 bgcolor=#d6d6d6
| 238403 ||  || — || March 15, 2004 || Catalina || CSS || — || align=right | 5.1 km || 
|-id=404 bgcolor=#d6d6d6
| 238404 ||  || — || March 15, 2004 || Kitt Peak || Spacewatch || — || align=right | 4.0 km || 
|-id=405 bgcolor=#d6d6d6
| 238405 ||  || — || March 15, 2004 || Kitt Peak || Spacewatch || HYG || align=right | 3.0 km || 
|-id=406 bgcolor=#d6d6d6
| 238406 ||  || — || March 15, 2004 || Kitt Peak || Spacewatch || HYG || align=right | 3.5 km || 
|-id=407 bgcolor=#d6d6d6
| 238407 ||  || — || March 14, 2004 || Socorro || LINEAR || TIR || align=right | 3.0 km || 
|-id=408 bgcolor=#d6d6d6
| 238408 ||  || — || March 14, 2004 || Socorro || LINEAR || ALA || align=right | 7.3 km || 
|-id=409 bgcolor=#d6d6d6
| 238409 ||  || — || March 14, 2004 || Socorro || LINEAR || URS || align=right | 5.5 km || 
|-id=410 bgcolor=#d6d6d6
| 238410 ||  || — || March 14, 2004 || Socorro || LINEAR || — || align=right | 5.5 km || 
|-id=411 bgcolor=#d6d6d6
| 238411 ||  || — || March 13, 2004 || Palomar || NEAT || — || align=right | 5.8 km || 
|-id=412 bgcolor=#d6d6d6
| 238412 ||  || — || March 15, 2004 || Socorro || LINEAR || — || align=right | 6.4 km || 
|-id=413 bgcolor=#d6d6d6
| 238413 ||  || — || March 15, 2004 || Kitt Peak || Spacewatch || — || align=right | 3.0 km || 
|-id=414 bgcolor=#d6d6d6
| 238414 ||  || — || March 16, 2004 || Goodricke-Pigott || R. A. Tucker || — || align=right | 3.9 km || 
|-id=415 bgcolor=#d6d6d6
| 238415 ||  || — || March 16, 2004 || Socorro || LINEAR || HYG || align=right | 4.4 km || 
|-id=416 bgcolor=#d6d6d6
| 238416 ||  || — || March 16, 2004 || Socorro || LINEAR || — || align=right | 4.1 km || 
|-id=417 bgcolor=#d6d6d6
| 238417 ||  || — || March 16, 2004 || Kitt Peak || Spacewatch || — || align=right | 4.0 km || 
|-id=418 bgcolor=#d6d6d6
| 238418 ||  || — || March 16, 2004 || Socorro || LINEAR || HYG || align=right | 6.0 km || 
|-id=419 bgcolor=#d6d6d6
| 238419 ||  || — || March 19, 2004 || Socorro || LINEAR || — || align=right | 4.5 km || 
|-id=420 bgcolor=#d6d6d6
| 238420 ||  || — || March 17, 2004 || Kitt Peak || Spacewatch || — || align=right | 2.5 km || 
|-id=421 bgcolor=#d6d6d6
| 238421 ||  || — || March 18, 2004 || Catalina || CSS || LIX || align=right | 4.9 km || 
|-id=422 bgcolor=#d6d6d6
| 238422 ||  || — || March 23, 2004 || Socorro || LINEAR || MEL || align=right | 3.3 km || 
|-id=423 bgcolor=#d6d6d6
| 238423 ||  || — || March 17, 2004 || Kitt Peak || Spacewatch || THM || align=right | 2.9 km || 
|-id=424 bgcolor=#d6d6d6
| 238424 ||  || — || April 10, 2004 || Catalina || CSS || — || align=right | 4.8 km || 
|-id=425 bgcolor=#d6d6d6
| 238425 ||  || — || April 11, 2004 || Palomar || NEAT || EOS || align=right | 5.2 km || 
|-id=426 bgcolor=#d6d6d6
| 238426 ||  || — || April 9, 2004 || Siding Spring || SSS || VER || align=right | 4.4 km || 
|-id=427 bgcolor=#d6d6d6
| 238427 ||  || — || April 14, 2004 || Anderson Mesa || LONEOS || EUP || align=right | 6.2 km || 
|-id=428 bgcolor=#d6d6d6
| 238428 ||  || — || April 11, 2004 || Palomar || NEAT || — || align=right | 4.5 km || 
|-id=429 bgcolor=#d6d6d6
| 238429 ||  || — || April 22, 2004 || Desert Eagle || W. K. Y. Yeung || — || align=right | 3.6 km || 
|-id=430 bgcolor=#d6d6d6
| 238430 ||  || — || April 21, 2004 || Kitt Peak || Spacewatch || ALA || align=right | 5.9 km || 
|-id=431 bgcolor=#d6d6d6
| 238431 ||  || — || May 13, 2004 || Kitt Peak || Spacewatch || 7:4 || align=right | 5.4 km || 
|-id=432 bgcolor=#fefefe
| 238432 ||  || — || June 12, 2004 || Catalina || CSS || PHO || align=right | 2.1 km || 
|-id=433 bgcolor=#fefefe
| 238433 ||  || — || July 14, 2004 || Socorro || LINEAR || — || align=right data-sort-value="0.94" | 940 m || 
|-id=434 bgcolor=#fefefe
| 238434 ||  || — || July 16, 2004 || Socorro || LINEAR || V || align=right data-sort-value="0.89" | 890 m || 
|-id=435 bgcolor=#fefefe
| 238435 ||  || — || July 22, 2004 || Mauna Kea || C. Veillet || FLO || align=right data-sort-value="0.83" | 830 m || 
|-id=436 bgcolor=#fefefe
| 238436 ||  || — || August 6, 2004 || Palomar || NEAT || NYS || align=right data-sort-value="0.88" | 880 m || 
|-id=437 bgcolor=#fefefe
| 238437 ||  || — || August 8, 2004 || Socorro || LINEAR || FLO || align=right | 1.0 km || 
|-id=438 bgcolor=#fefefe
| 238438 ||  || — || August 7, 2004 || Palomar || NEAT || — || align=right data-sort-value="0.87" | 870 m || 
|-id=439 bgcolor=#fefefe
| 238439 ||  || — || August 8, 2004 || Socorro || LINEAR || — || align=right | 1.3 km || 
|-id=440 bgcolor=#fefefe
| 238440 ||  || — || August 8, 2004 || Anderson Mesa || LONEOS || PHO || align=right | 1.8 km || 
|-id=441 bgcolor=#fefefe
| 238441 ||  || — || August 8, 2004 || Socorro || LINEAR || — || align=right | 1.1 km || 
|-id=442 bgcolor=#fefefe
| 238442 ||  || — || August 8, 2004 || Socorro || LINEAR || V || align=right data-sort-value="0.92" | 920 m || 
|-id=443 bgcolor=#fefefe
| 238443 ||  || — || August 8, 2004 || Socorro || LINEAR || — || align=right | 3.3 km || 
|-id=444 bgcolor=#fefefe
| 238444 ||  || — || August 9, 2004 || Socorro || LINEAR || FLO || align=right data-sort-value="0.70" | 700 m || 
|-id=445 bgcolor=#fefefe
| 238445 ||  || — || August 9, 2004 || Socorro || LINEAR || — || align=right | 1.7 km || 
|-id=446 bgcolor=#fefefe
| 238446 ||  || — || August 10, 2004 || Anderson Mesa || LONEOS || — || align=right data-sort-value="0.99" | 990 m || 
|-id=447 bgcolor=#fefefe
| 238447 ||  || — || August 8, 2004 || Socorro || LINEAR || — || align=right | 1.1 km || 
|-id=448 bgcolor=#fefefe
| 238448 ||  || — || August 8, 2004 || Anderson Mesa || LONEOS || FLO || align=right | 1.5 km || 
|-id=449 bgcolor=#fefefe
| 238449 ||  || — || August 9, 2004 || Socorro || LINEAR || V || align=right data-sort-value="0.97" | 970 m || 
|-id=450 bgcolor=#E9E9E9
| 238450 ||  || — || August 12, 2004 || Socorro || LINEAR || — || align=right | 1.7 km || 
|-id=451 bgcolor=#fefefe
| 238451 ||  || — || August 12, 2004 || Socorro || LINEAR || ERI || align=right | 2.9 km || 
|-id=452 bgcolor=#fefefe
| 238452 ||  || — || August 15, 2004 || Siding Spring || SSS || — || align=right | 2.4 km || 
|-id=453 bgcolor=#FA8072
| 238453 ||  || — || August 16, 2004 || Palomar || NEAT || — || align=right | 1.0 km || 
|-id=454 bgcolor=#fefefe
| 238454 ||  || — || August 21, 2004 || Siding Spring || SSS || FLO || align=right data-sort-value="0.77" | 770 m || 
|-id=455 bgcolor=#fefefe
| 238455 ||  || — || August 23, 2004 || Kitt Peak || Spacewatch || — || align=right | 1.4 km || 
|-id=456 bgcolor=#FFC2E0
| 238456 ||  || — || September 3, 2004 || Anderson Mesa || LONEOS || APO || align=right data-sort-value="0.33" | 330 m || 
|-id=457 bgcolor=#fefefe
| 238457 ||  || — || September 6, 2004 || Socorro || LINEAR || PHO || align=right | 2.3 km || 
|-id=458 bgcolor=#E9E9E9
| 238458 ||  || — || September 6, 2004 || Siding Spring || SSS || ADE || align=right | 3.9 km || 
|-id=459 bgcolor=#fefefe
| 238459 ||  || — || September 6, 2004 || Siding Spring || SSS || — || align=right | 1.1 km || 
|-id=460 bgcolor=#fefefe
| 238460 ||  || — || September 7, 2004 || Socorro || LINEAR || — || align=right | 1.2 km || 
|-id=461 bgcolor=#fefefe
| 238461 ||  || — || September 7, 2004 || Kitt Peak || Spacewatch || MAS || align=right data-sort-value="0.90" | 900 m || 
|-id=462 bgcolor=#fefefe
| 238462 ||  || — || September 8, 2004 || Socorro || LINEAR || — || align=right | 2.0 km || 
|-id=463 bgcolor=#fefefe
| 238463 ||  || — || September 8, 2004 || Socorro || LINEAR || — || align=right data-sort-value="0.88" | 880 m || 
|-id=464 bgcolor=#E9E9E9
| 238464 ||  || — || September 8, 2004 || Socorro || LINEAR || — || align=right | 2.6 km || 
|-id=465 bgcolor=#fefefe
| 238465 ||  || — || September 8, 2004 || Socorro || LINEAR || V || align=right data-sort-value="0.98" | 980 m || 
|-id=466 bgcolor=#fefefe
| 238466 ||  || — || September 8, 2004 || Socorro || LINEAR || — || align=right | 1.1 km || 
|-id=467 bgcolor=#fefefe
| 238467 ||  || — || September 8, 2004 || Socorro || LINEAR || — || align=right | 1.1 km || 
|-id=468 bgcolor=#fefefe
| 238468 ||  || — || September 8, 2004 || Socorro || LINEAR || — || align=right data-sort-value="0.91" | 910 m || 
|-id=469 bgcolor=#fefefe
| 238469 ||  || — || September 8, 2004 || Socorro || LINEAR || — || align=right | 1.2 km || 
|-id=470 bgcolor=#fefefe
| 238470 ||  || — || September 8, 2004 || Socorro || LINEAR || V || align=right | 1.1 km || 
|-id=471 bgcolor=#fefefe
| 238471 ||  || — || September 8, 2004 || Socorro || LINEAR || V || align=right | 1.3 km || 
|-id=472 bgcolor=#fefefe
| 238472 ||  || — || September 8, 2004 || Socorro || LINEAR || MAS || align=right | 1.00 km || 
|-id=473 bgcolor=#fefefe
| 238473 ||  || — || September 8, 2004 || Socorro || LINEAR || — || align=right | 2.8 km || 
|-id=474 bgcolor=#fefefe
| 238474 ||  || — || September 8, 2004 || Socorro || LINEAR || — || align=right data-sort-value="0.89" | 890 m || 
|-id=475 bgcolor=#fefefe
| 238475 ||  || — || September 7, 2004 || Socorro || LINEAR || — || align=right | 1.2 km || 
|-id=476 bgcolor=#fefefe
| 238476 ||  || — || September 8, 2004 || Socorro || LINEAR || — || align=right | 1.4 km || 
|-id=477 bgcolor=#fefefe
| 238477 ||  || — || September 8, 2004 || Palomar || NEAT || — || align=right | 1.4 km || 
|-id=478 bgcolor=#fefefe
| 238478 ||  || — || September 8, 2004 || Palomar || NEAT || V || align=right | 1.3 km || 
|-id=479 bgcolor=#E9E9E9
| 238479 ||  || — || September 10, 2004 || Socorro || LINEAR || ADE || align=right | 3.0 km || 
|-id=480 bgcolor=#fefefe
| 238480 ||  || — || September 10, 2004 || Socorro || LINEAR || — || align=right | 2.2 km || 
|-id=481 bgcolor=#fefefe
| 238481 ||  || — || September 9, 2004 || Kitt Peak || Spacewatch || — || align=right data-sort-value="0.90" | 900 m || 
|-id=482 bgcolor=#fefefe
| 238482 ||  || — || September 10, 2004 || Socorro || LINEAR || FLO || align=right data-sort-value="0.94" | 940 m || 
|-id=483 bgcolor=#fefefe
| 238483 ||  || — || September 10, 2004 || Socorro || LINEAR || — || align=right | 1.2 km || 
|-id=484 bgcolor=#fefefe
| 238484 ||  || — || September 7, 2004 || Socorro || LINEAR || FLO || align=right | 1.6 km || 
|-id=485 bgcolor=#fefefe
| 238485 ||  || — || September 9, 2004 || Kitt Peak || Spacewatch || V || align=right data-sort-value="0.90" | 900 m || 
|-id=486 bgcolor=#fefefe
| 238486 ||  || — || September 9, 2004 || Kitt Peak || Spacewatch || V || align=right data-sort-value="0.99" | 990 m || 
|-id=487 bgcolor=#fefefe
| 238487 ||  || — || September 10, 2004 || Kitt Peak || Spacewatch || ERI || align=right | 2.0 km || 
|-id=488 bgcolor=#fefefe
| 238488 ||  || — || September 9, 2004 || Anderson Mesa || LONEOS || — || align=right | 1.0 km || 
|-id=489 bgcolor=#fefefe
| 238489 ||  || — || September 11, 2004 || Kitt Peak || Spacewatch || — || align=right | 1.0 km || 
|-id=490 bgcolor=#fefefe
| 238490 ||  || — || September 15, 2004 || Kitt Peak || Spacewatch || — || align=right | 1.3 km || 
|-id=491 bgcolor=#fefefe
| 238491 ||  || — || September 15, 2004 || Kitt Peak || Spacewatch || MAS || align=right data-sort-value="0.92" | 920 m || 
|-id=492 bgcolor=#fefefe
| 238492 ||  || — || September 13, 2004 || Palomar || NEAT || V || align=right data-sort-value="0.98" | 980 m || 
|-id=493 bgcolor=#fefefe
| 238493 ||  || — || September 15, 2004 || Kitt Peak || Spacewatch || SUL || align=right | 2.5 km || 
|-id=494 bgcolor=#E9E9E9
| 238494 ||  || — || September 15, 2004 || Kitt Peak || Spacewatch || — || align=right | 1.0 km || 
|-id=495 bgcolor=#fefefe
| 238495 ||  || — || September 15, 2004 || Kitt Peak || Spacewatch || — || align=right | 1.2 km || 
|-id=496 bgcolor=#FA8072
| 238496 ||  || — || September 9, 2004 || Socorro || LINEAR || — || align=right data-sort-value="0.96" | 960 m || 
|-id=497 bgcolor=#fefefe
| 238497 ||  || — || September 21, 2004 || Kitt Peak || Spacewatch || — || align=right data-sort-value="0.81" | 810 m || 
|-id=498 bgcolor=#fefefe
| 238498 ||  || — || September 17, 2004 || Socorro || LINEAR || — || align=right data-sort-value="0.97" | 970 m || 
|-id=499 bgcolor=#fefefe
| 238499 ||  || — || September 17, 2004 || Socorro || LINEAR || V || align=right | 1.2 km || 
|-id=500 bgcolor=#fefefe
| 238500 ||  || — || September 17, 2004 || Socorro || LINEAR || — || align=right | 1.0 km || 
|}

238501–238600 

|-bgcolor=#fefefe
| 238501 ||  || — || September 21, 2004 || Socorro || LINEAR || — || align=right | 1.3 km || 
|-id=502 bgcolor=#fefefe
| 238502 ||  || — || September 22, 2004 || Socorro || LINEAR || — || align=right | 1.0 km || 
|-id=503 bgcolor=#FA8072
| 238503 ||  || — || September 22, 2004 || Socorro || LINEAR || — || align=right | 1.0 km || 
|-id=504 bgcolor=#fefefe
| 238504 ||  || — || September 16, 2004 || Anderson Mesa || LONEOS || — || align=right | 1.4 km || 
|-id=505 bgcolor=#E9E9E9
| 238505 ||  || — || October 4, 2004 || Kitt Peak || Spacewatch || — || align=right | 3.3 km || 
|-id=506 bgcolor=#fefefe
| 238506 ||  || — || October 5, 2004 || Anderson Mesa || LONEOS || NYS || align=right | 2.1 km || 
|-id=507 bgcolor=#fefefe
| 238507 ||  || — || October 7, 2004 || Goodricke-Pigott || R. A. Tucker || V || align=right data-sort-value="0.91" | 910 m || 
|-id=508 bgcolor=#fefefe
| 238508 ||  || — || October 4, 2004 || Kitt Peak || Spacewatch || — || align=right data-sort-value="0.93" | 930 m || 
|-id=509 bgcolor=#E9E9E9
| 238509 ||  || — || October 4, 2004 || Kitt Peak || Spacewatch || GEF || align=right | 2.0 km || 
|-id=510 bgcolor=#E9E9E9
| 238510 ||  || — || October 4, 2004 || Kitt Peak || Spacewatch || — || align=right | 1.2 km || 
|-id=511 bgcolor=#E9E9E9
| 238511 ||  || — || October 5, 2004 || Anderson Mesa || LONEOS || — || align=right | 1.8 km || 
|-id=512 bgcolor=#fefefe
| 238512 ||  || — || October 5, 2004 || Palomar || NEAT || — || align=right | 2.0 km || 
|-id=513 bgcolor=#fefefe
| 238513 ||  || — || October 5, 2004 || Kitt Peak || Spacewatch || V || align=right data-sort-value="0.81" | 810 m || 
|-id=514 bgcolor=#E9E9E9
| 238514 ||  || — || October 5, 2004 || Kitt Peak || Spacewatch || — || align=right data-sort-value="0.89" | 890 m || 
|-id=515 bgcolor=#fefefe
| 238515 ||  || — || October 7, 2004 || Socorro || LINEAR || — || align=right data-sort-value="0.91" | 910 m || 
|-id=516 bgcolor=#fefefe
| 238516 ||  || — || October 7, 2004 || Socorro || LINEAR || — || align=right | 1.1 km || 
|-id=517 bgcolor=#E9E9E9
| 238517 ||  || — || October 7, 2004 || Palomar || NEAT || — || align=right | 1.1 km || 
|-id=518 bgcolor=#FA8072
| 238518 ||  || — || October 7, 2004 || Anderson Mesa || LONEOS || — || align=right | 1.0 km || 
|-id=519 bgcolor=#FA8072
| 238519 ||  || — || October 7, 2004 || Anderson Mesa || LONEOS || — || align=right | 1.5 km || 
|-id=520 bgcolor=#fefefe
| 238520 ||  || — || October 4, 2004 || Kitt Peak || Spacewatch || — || align=right | 1.3 km || 
|-id=521 bgcolor=#fefefe
| 238521 ||  || — || October 6, 2004 || Kitt Peak || Spacewatch || — || align=right | 1.1 km || 
|-id=522 bgcolor=#E9E9E9
| 238522 ||  || — || October 6, 2004 || Kitt Peak || Spacewatch || — || align=right data-sort-value="0.99" | 990 m || 
|-id=523 bgcolor=#fefefe
| 238523 ||  || — || October 7, 2004 || Socorro || LINEAR || NYS || align=right | 2.6 km || 
|-id=524 bgcolor=#E9E9E9
| 238524 ||  || — || October 8, 2004 || Socorro || LINEAR || — || align=right | 3.5 km || 
|-id=525 bgcolor=#fefefe
| 238525 ||  || — || October 7, 2004 || Kitt Peak || Spacewatch || — || align=right | 1.1 km || 
|-id=526 bgcolor=#fefefe
| 238526 ||  || — || October 7, 2004 || Kitt Peak || Spacewatch || — || align=right | 1.0 km || 
|-id=527 bgcolor=#fefefe
| 238527 ||  || — || October 6, 2004 || Socorro || LINEAR || — || align=right | 4.6 km || 
|-id=528 bgcolor=#fefefe
| 238528 ||  || — || October 10, 2004 || Socorro || LINEAR || — || align=right | 1.3 km || 
|-id=529 bgcolor=#E9E9E9
| 238529 ||  || — || October 9, 2004 || Socorro || LINEAR || — || align=right | 3.8 km || 
|-id=530 bgcolor=#fefefe
| 238530 ||  || — || October 9, 2004 || Kitt Peak || Spacewatch || — || align=right | 1.0 km || 
|-id=531 bgcolor=#fefefe
| 238531 ||  || — || October 9, 2004 || Kitt Peak || Spacewatch || FLO || align=right | 1.7 km || 
|-id=532 bgcolor=#fefefe
| 238532 ||  || — || October 11, 2004 || Kitt Peak || Spacewatch || FLO || align=right data-sort-value="0.88" | 880 m || 
|-id=533 bgcolor=#E9E9E9
| 238533 ||  || — || October 11, 2004 || Kitt Peak || Spacewatch || — || align=right | 1.3 km || 
|-id=534 bgcolor=#fefefe
| 238534 ||  || — || October 9, 2004 || Kitt Peak || Spacewatch || NYS || align=right data-sort-value="0.84" | 840 m || 
|-id=535 bgcolor=#E9E9E9
| 238535 ||  || — || October 10, 2004 || Kitt Peak || Spacewatch || — || align=right data-sort-value="0.88" | 880 m || 
|-id=536 bgcolor=#fefefe
| 238536 ||  || — || November 3, 2004 || Kitt Peak || Spacewatch || NYS || align=right | 1.00 km || 
|-id=537 bgcolor=#E9E9E9
| 238537 ||  || — || November 3, 2004 || Catalina || CSS || — || align=right | 1.4 km || 
|-id=538 bgcolor=#fefefe
| 238538 ||  || — || November 3, 2004 || Palomar || NEAT || — || align=right | 1.5 km || 
|-id=539 bgcolor=#E9E9E9
| 238539 ||  || — || November 4, 2004 || Kitt Peak || Spacewatch || — || align=right | 2.9 km || 
|-id=540 bgcolor=#E9E9E9
| 238540 ||  || — || November 4, 2004 || Catalina || CSS || — || align=right | 1.2 km || 
|-id=541 bgcolor=#E9E9E9
| 238541 ||  || — || November 4, 2004 || Anderson Mesa || LONEOS || — || align=right | 1.4 km || 
|-id=542 bgcolor=#fefefe
| 238542 ||  || — || November 5, 2004 || Palomar || NEAT || PHO || align=right | 1.8 km || 
|-id=543 bgcolor=#E9E9E9
| 238543 ||  || — || November 4, 2004 || Kitt Peak || Spacewatch || PAD || align=right | 3.3 km || 
|-id=544 bgcolor=#E9E9E9
| 238544 ||  || — || November 4, 2004 || Kitt Peak || Spacewatch || — || align=right | 1.5 km || 
|-id=545 bgcolor=#E9E9E9
| 238545 ||  || — || November 6, 2004 || Socorro || LINEAR || MIT || align=right | 3.3 km || 
|-id=546 bgcolor=#fefefe
| 238546 ||  || — || November 13, 2004 || Great Shefford || P. Birtwhistle || NYS || align=right data-sort-value="0.78" | 780 m || 
|-id=547 bgcolor=#E9E9E9
| 238547 ||  || — || November 4, 2004 || Catalina || CSS || — || align=right | 1.9 km || 
|-id=548 bgcolor=#E9E9E9
| 238548 ||  || — || November 7, 2004 || Socorro || LINEAR || — || align=right | 3.4 km || 
|-id=549 bgcolor=#fefefe
| 238549 ||  || — || November 12, 2004 || Catalina || CSS || — || align=right | 1.3 km || 
|-id=550 bgcolor=#fefefe
| 238550 ||  || — || November 4, 2004 || Kitt Peak || Spacewatch || — || align=right | 1.2 km || 
|-id=551 bgcolor=#E9E9E9
| 238551 ||  || — || November 11, 2004 || Kitt Peak || Spacewatch || — || align=right | 1.4 km || 
|-id=552 bgcolor=#E9E9E9
| 238552 ||  || — || November 19, 2004 || Catalina || CSS || MAR || align=right | 1.4 km || 
|-id=553 bgcolor=#E9E9E9
| 238553 ||  || — || December 2, 2004 || Catalina || CSS || — || align=right | 1.3 km || 
|-id=554 bgcolor=#E9E9E9
| 238554 ||  || — || December 8, 2004 || Socorro || LINEAR || — || align=right | 3.7 km || 
|-id=555 bgcolor=#E9E9E9
| 238555 ||  || — || December 8, 2004 || Socorro || LINEAR || — || align=right | 3.0 km || 
|-id=556 bgcolor=#E9E9E9
| 238556 ||  || — || December 8, 2004 || Socorro || LINEAR || WIT || align=right | 1.6 km || 
|-id=557 bgcolor=#E9E9E9
| 238557 ||  || — || December 9, 2004 || Kitt Peak || Spacewatch || — || align=right | 3.8 km || 
|-id=558 bgcolor=#E9E9E9
| 238558 ||  || — || December 10, 2004 || Socorro || LINEAR || — || align=right | 1.6 km || 
|-id=559 bgcolor=#E9E9E9
| 238559 ||  || — || December 10, 2004 || Socorro || LINEAR || RAF || align=right | 1.6 km || 
|-id=560 bgcolor=#d6d6d6
| 238560 ||  || — || December 2, 2004 || Socorro || LINEAR || SHU3:2 || align=right | 8.7 km || 
|-id=561 bgcolor=#fefefe
| 238561 ||  || — || December 10, 2004 || Socorro || LINEAR || — || align=right | 3.9 km || 
|-id=562 bgcolor=#fefefe
| 238562 ||  || — || December 10, 2004 || Kitt Peak || Spacewatch || — || align=right | 1.7 km || 
|-id=563 bgcolor=#E9E9E9
| 238563 ||  || — || December 12, 2004 || Kitt Peak || Spacewatch || — || align=right | 1.2 km || 
|-id=564 bgcolor=#E9E9E9
| 238564 ||  || — || December 2, 2004 || Kitt Peak || Spacewatch || — || align=right | 3.0 km || 
|-id=565 bgcolor=#E9E9E9
| 238565 ||  || — || December 8, 2004 || Socorro || LINEAR || — || align=right | 4.0 km || 
|-id=566 bgcolor=#E9E9E9
| 238566 ||  || — || December 9, 2004 || Kitt Peak || Spacewatch || — || align=right | 1.5 km || 
|-id=567 bgcolor=#E9E9E9
| 238567 ||  || — || December 10, 2004 || Socorro || LINEAR || MAR || align=right | 1.6 km || 
|-id=568 bgcolor=#E9E9E9
| 238568 ||  || — || December 10, 2004 || Jarnac || Jarnac Obs. || — || align=right | 2.9 km || 
|-id=569 bgcolor=#E9E9E9
| 238569 ||  || — || December 10, 2004 || Socorro || LINEAR || — || align=right | 1.7 km || 
|-id=570 bgcolor=#E9E9E9
| 238570 ||  || — || December 13, 2004 || Kitt Peak || Spacewatch || — || align=right | 2.0 km || 
|-id=571 bgcolor=#fefefe
| 238571 ||  || — || December 9, 2004 || Catalina || CSS || V || align=right | 1.1 km || 
|-id=572 bgcolor=#E9E9E9
| 238572 ||  || — || December 11, 2004 || Socorro || LINEAR || — || align=right | 1.8 km || 
|-id=573 bgcolor=#fefefe
| 238573 ||  || — || December 11, 2004 || Kitt Peak || Spacewatch || — || align=right | 1.3 km || 
|-id=574 bgcolor=#E9E9E9
| 238574 ||  || — || December 14, 2004 || Kitt Peak || Spacewatch || — || align=right | 1.4 km || 
|-id=575 bgcolor=#E9E9E9
| 238575 ||  || — || December 15, 2004 || Kitt Peak || Spacewatch || — || align=right | 1.3 km || 
|-id=576 bgcolor=#E9E9E9
| 238576 ||  || — || December 10, 2004 || Socorro || LINEAR || — || align=right | 4.0 km || 
|-id=577 bgcolor=#E9E9E9
| 238577 ||  || — || December 10, 2004 || Socorro || LINEAR || GAL || align=right | 1.9 km || 
|-id=578 bgcolor=#E9E9E9
| 238578 ||  || — || December 12, 2004 || Kitt Peak || Spacewatch || — || align=right | 2.2 km || 
|-id=579 bgcolor=#E9E9E9
| 238579 ||  || — || December 14, 2004 || Catalina || CSS || — || align=right | 3.9 km || 
|-id=580 bgcolor=#fefefe
| 238580 ||  || — || December 15, 2004 || Catalina || CSS || — || align=right | 3.2 km || 
|-id=581 bgcolor=#E9E9E9
| 238581 ||  || — || December 15, 2004 || Kitt Peak || Spacewatch || — || align=right | 1.9 km || 
|-id=582 bgcolor=#E9E9E9
| 238582 ||  || — || December 1, 2004 || Socorro || LINEAR || ADE || align=right | 3.2 km || 
|-id=583 bgcolor=#E9E9E9
| 238583 ||  || — || December 9, 2004 || Catalina || CSS || — || align=right | 3.7 km || 
|-id=584 bgcolor=#E9E9E9
| 238584 ||  || — || December 15, 2004 || Socorro || LINEAR || — || align=right | 3.2 km || 
|-id=585 bgcolor=#E9E9E9
| 238585 ||  || — || December 11, 2004 || Catalina || CSS || — || align=right | 3.3 km || 
|-id=586 bgcolor=#E9E9E9
| 238586 ||  || — || December 16, 2004 || Socorro || LINEAR || — || align=right | 2.5 km || 
|-id=587 bgcolor=#E9E9E9
| 238587 ||  || — || December 16, 2004 || Kitt Peak || Spacewatch || — || align=right | 2.7 km || 
|-id=588 bgcolor=#d6d6d6
| 238588 ||  || — || December 16, 2004 || Kitt Peak || Spacewatch || KOR || align=right | 2.1 km || 
|-id=589 bgcolor=#E9E9E9
| 238589 ||  || — || December 20, 2004 || Needville || D. Wells || EUN || align=right | 2.0 km || 
|-id=590 bgcolor=#E9E9E9
| 238590 ||  || — || December 18, 2004 || Mount Lemmon || Mount Lemmon Survey || — || align=right | 3.0 km || 
|-id=591 bgcolor=#E9E9E9
| 238591 ||  || — || December 18, 2004 || Mount Lemmon || Mount Lemmon Survey || — || align=right | 2.0 km || 
|-id=592 bgcolor=#E9E9E9
| 238592 ||  || — || December 18, 2004 || Socorro || LINEAR || — || align=right | 2.0 km || 
|-id=593 bgcolor=#E9E9E9
| 238593 Paysdegex || 2005 AS ||  || January 4, 2005 || Vicques || M. Ory || — || align=right | 1.7 km || 
|-id=594 bgcolor=#fefefe
| 238594 ||  || — || January 6, 2005 || Catalina || CSS || — || align=right | 1.5 km || 
|-id=595 bgcolor=#E9E9E9
| 238595 ||  || — || January 6, 2005 || Catalina || CSS || — || align=right | 2.9 km || 
|-id=596 bgcolor=#E9E9E9
| 238596 ||  || — || January 6, 2005 || Socorro || LINEAR || — || align=right | 1.3 km || 
|-id=597 bgcolor=#E9E9E9
| 238597 ||  || — || January 6, 2005 || Socorro || LINEAR || — || align=right | 2.0 km || 
|-id=598 bgcolor=#E9E9E9
| 238598 ||  || — || January 7, 2005 || Socorro || LINEAR || — || align=right | 2.3 km || 
|-id=599 bgcolor=#E9E9E9
| 238599 ||  || — || January 7, 2005 || Kitt Peak || Spacewatch || — || align=right | 3.0 km || 
|-id=600 bgcolor=#d6d6d6
| 238600 ||  || — || January 15, 2005 || Socorro || LINEAR || — || align=right | 2.5 km || 
|}

238601–238700 

|-bgcolor=#E9E9E9
| 238601 ||  || — || January 15, 2005 || Kitt Peak || Spacewatch || — || align=right | 1.8 km || 
|-id=602 bgcolor=#E9E9E9
| 238602 ||  || — || January 11, 2005 || Socorro || LINEAR || — || align=right | 3.1 km || 
|-id=603 bgcolor=#E9E9E9
| 238603 ||  || — || January 13, 2005 || Kitt Peak || Spacewatch || — || align=right | 2.0 km || 
|-id=604 bgcolor=#d6d6d6
| 238604 ||  || — || January 13, 2005 || Socorro || LINEAR || — || align=right | 5.6 km || 
|-id=605 bgcolor=#E9E9E9
| 238605 ||  || — || January 15, 2005 || Socorro || LINEAR || — || align=right | 2.2 km || 
|-id=606 bgcolor=#E9E9E9
| 238606 ||  || — || January 13, 2005 || Catalina || CSS || — || align=right | 1.7 km || 
|-id=607 bgcolor=#E9E9E9
| 238607 ||  || — || January 15, 2005 || Kitt Peak || Spacewatch || — || align=right | 1.7 km || 
|-id=608 bgcolor=#E9E9E9
| 238608 ||  || — || January 15, 2005 || Kitt Peak || Spacewatch || — || align=right | 2.3 km || 
|-id=609 bgcolor=#E9E9E9
| 238609 ||  || — || January 15, 2005 || Kitt Peak || Spacewatch || — || align=right | 3.4 km || 
|-id=610 bgcolor=#E9E9E9
| 238610 ||  || — || January 16, 2005 || Desert Eagle || W. K. Y. Yeung || — || align=right | 1.8 km || 
|-id=611 bgcolor=#E9E9E9
| 238611 ||  || — || January 16, 2005 || Socorro || LINEAR || HNS || align=right | 1.7 km || 
|-id=612 bgcolor=#E9E9E9
| 238612 ||  || — || January 16, 2005 || Socorro || LINEAR || HNA || align=right | 2.5 km || 
|-id=613 bgcolor=#E9E9E9
| 238613 ||  || — || January 16, 2005 || Socorro || LINEAR || AEO || align=right | 1.4 km || 
|-id=614 bgcolor=#E9E9E9
| 238614 ||  || — || January 16, 2005 || Kitt Peak || Spacewatch || — || align=right | 1.4 km || 
|-id=615 bgcolor=#fefefe
| 238615 ||  || — || January 16, 2005 || Socorro || LINEAR || V || align=right | 1.2 km || 
|-id=616 bgcolor=#d6d6d6
| 238616 ||  || — || January 16, 2005 || Kitt Peak || Spacewatch || — || align=right | 3.1 km || 
|-id=617 bgcolor=#E9E9E9
| 238617 ||  || — || January 16, 2005 || Kitt Peak || Spacewatch || — || align=right | 2.4 km || 
|-id=618 bgcolor=#E9E9E9
| 238618 ||  || — || January 17, 2005 || Kitt Peak || Spacewatch || — || align=right | 2.0 km || 
|-id=619 bgcolor=#E9E9E9
| 238619 ||  || — || January 17, 2005 || Catalina || CSS || — || align=right | 2.3 km || 
|-id=620 bgcolor=#E9E9E9
| 238620 ||  || — || January 18, 2005 || Catalina || CSS || BRU || align=right | 4.0 km || 
|-id=621 bgcolor=#E9E9E9
| 238621 ||  || — || January 16, 2005 || Mauna Kea || C. Veillet || HEN || align=right | 1.2 km || 
|-id=622 bgcolor=#d6d6d6
| 238622 ||  || — || February 1, 2005 || Catalina || CSS || — || align=right | 5.8 km || 
|-id=623 bgcolor=#C2FFFF
| 238623 ||  || — || February 1, 2005 || Piszkéstető || Piszkéstető Stn. || L5 || align=right | 13 km || 
|-id=624 bgcolor=#E9E9E9
| 238624 ||  || — || February 2, 2005 || Palomar || NEAT || — || align=right | 2.2 km || 
|-id=625 bgcolor=#d6d6d6
| 238625 ||  || — || February 2, 2005 || Kitt Peak || Spacewatch || — || align=right | 3.8 km || 
|-id=626 bgcolor=#E9E9E9
| 238626 ||  || — || February 2, 2005 || Catalina || CSS || — || align=right | 2.9 km || 
|-id=627 bgcolor=#E9E9E9
| 238627 ||  || — || February 2, 2005 || Catalina || CSS || AEO || align=right | 2.8 km || 
|-id=628 bgcolor=#E9E9E9
| 238628 ||  || — || February 3, 2005 || Socorro || LINEAR || — || align=right | 1.8 km || 
|-id=629 bgcolor=#E9E9E9
| 238629 ||  || — || February 2, 2005 || Palomar || NEAT || — || align=right | 3.7 km || 
|-id=630 bgcolor=#E9E9E9
| 238630 ||  || — || February 4, 2005 || Altschwendt || Altschwendt Obs. || — || align=right | 2.2 km || 
|-id=631 bgcolor=#d6d6d6
| 238631 ||  || — || February 2, 2005 || Socorro || LINEAR || — || align=right | 5.3 km || 
|-id=632 bgcolor=#E9E9E9
| 238632 ||  || — || February 1, 2005 || Kitt Peak || Spacewatch || — || align=right | 2.5 km || 
|-id=633 bgcolor=#E9E9E9
| 238633 ||  || — || February 3, 2005 || Socorro || LINEAR || — || align=right | 2.4 km || 
|-id=634 bgcolor=#E9E9E9
| 238634 ||  || — || February 2, 2005 || Kitt Peak || Spacewatch || — || align=right | 2.8 km || 
|-id=635 bgcolor=#E9E9E9
| 238635 ||  || — || February 4, 2005 || Kitt Peak || Spacewatch || — || align=right | 2.3 km || 
|-id=636 bgcolor=#E9E9E9
| 238636 ||  || — || February 4, 2005 || Mount Lemmon || Mount Lemmon Survey || — || align=right | 2.4 km || 
|-id=637 bgcolor=#E9E9E9
| 238637 ||  || — || February 9, 2005 || Kitt Peak || Spacewatch || DOR || align=right | 4.0 km || 
|-id=638 bgcolor=#E9E9E9
| 238638 ||  || — || February 2, 2005 || Kitt Peak || Spacewatch || AST || align=right | 2.0 km || 
|-id=639 bgcolor=#d6d6d6
| 238639 ||  || — || March 1, 2005 || Kitt Peak || Spacewatch || — || align=right | 2.6 km || 
|-id=640 bgcolor=#d6d6d6
| 238640 ||  || — || March 1, 2005 || Kitt Peak || Spacewatch || — || align=right | 2.9 km || 
|-id=641 bgcolor=#E9E9E9
| 238641 ||  || — || March 2, 2005 || Catalina || CSS || — || align=right | 3.5 km || 
|-id=642 bgcolor=#E9E9E9
| 238642 ||  || — || March 2, 2005 || Catalina || CSS || DOR || align=right | 4.3 km || 
|-id=643 bgcolor=#d6d6d6
| 238643 ||  || — || March 3, 2005 || Kitt Peak || Spacewatch || — || align=right | 3.5 km || 
|-id=644 bgcolor=#d6d6d6
| 238644 ||  || — || March 3, 2005 || Catalina || CSS || VER || align=right | 5.2 km || 
|-id=645 bgcolor=#E9E9E9
| 238645 ||  || — || March 3, 2005 || Catalina || CSS || — || align=right | 2.7 km || 
|-id=646 bgcolor=#E9E9E9
| 238646 ||  || — || March 3, 2005 || Catalina || CSS || — || align=right | 3.7 km || 
|-id=647 bgcolor=#fefefe
| 238647 ||  || — || March 4, 2005 || Mount Lemmon || Mount Lemmon Survey || H || align=right | 1.3 km || 
|-id=648 bgcolor=#d6d6d6
| 238648 ||  || — || March 1, 2005 || Catalina || CSS || — || align=right | 3.8 km || 
|-id=649 bgcolor=#E9E9E9
| 238649 ||  || — || March 3, 2005 || Kitt Peak || Spacewatch || — || align=right | 2.2 km || 
|-id=650 bgcolor=#E9E9E9
| 238650 ||  || — || March 3, 2005 || Kitt Peak || Spacewatch || NEM || align=right | 3.3 km || 
|-id=651 bgcolor=#E9E9E9
| 238651 ||  || — || March 3, 2005 || Catalina || CSS || — || align=right | 2.4 km || 
|-id=652 bgcolor=#E9E9E9
| 238652 ||  || — || March 4, 2005 || Mount Lemmon || Mount Lemmon Survey || — || align=right | 4.2 km || 
|-id=653 bgcolor=#E9E9E9
| 238653 ||  || — || March 3, 2005 || Catalina || CSS || — || align=right | 3.4 km || 
|-id=654 bgcolor=#E9E9E9
| 238654 ||  || — || March 4, 2005 || Socorro || LINEAR || — || align=right | 3.4 km || 
|-id=655 bgcolor=#E9E9E9
| 238655 ||  || — || March 3, 2005 || Catalina || CSS || — || align=right | 2.5 km || 
|-id=656 bgcolor=#d6d6d6
| 238656 ||  || — || March 4, 2005 || Kitt Peak || Spacewatch || — || align=right | 3.4 km || 
|-id=657 bgcolor=#d6d6d6
| 238657 ||  || — || March 4, 2005 || Kitt Peak || Spacewatch || — || align=right | 3.2 km || 
|-id=658 bgcolor=#E9E9E9
| 238658 ||  || — || March 4, 2005 || Mount Lemmon || Mount Lemmon Survey || — || align=right | 3.4 km || 
|-id=659 bgcolor=#d6d6d6
| 238659 ||  || — || March 4, 2005 || Mount Lemmon || Mount Lemmon Survey || KOR || align=right | 1.5 km || 
|-id=660 bgcolor=#d6d6d6
| 238660 ||  || — || March 4, 2005 || Mount Lemmon || Mount Lemmon Survey || HYG || align=right | 3.2 km || 
|-id=661 bgcolor=#E9E9E9
| 238661 ||  || — || March 8, 2005 || Socorro || LINEAR || MRX || align=right | 1.6 km || 
|-id=662 bgcolor=#E9E9E9
| 238662 ||  || — || March 9, 2005 || Kitt Peak || Spacewatch || HEN || align=right | 1.5 km || 
|-id=663 bgcolor=#E9E9E9
| 238663 ||  || — || March 9, 2005 || Socorro || LINEAR || — || align=right | 3.9 km || 
|-id=664 bgcolor=#d6d6d6
| 238664 ||  || — || March 10, 2005 || Mount Lemmon || Mount Lemmon Survey || — || align=right | 2.9 km || 
|-id=665 bgcolor=#d6d6d6
| 238665 ||  || — || March 10, 2005 || Mount Lemmon || Mount Lemmon Survey || KOR || align=right | 1.8 km || 
|-id=666 bgcolor=#d6d6d6
| 238666 ||  || — || March 10, 2005 || Kitt Peak || Spacewatch || — || align=right | 3.9 km || 
|-id=667 bgcolor=#d6d6d6
| 238667 ||  || — || March 9, 2005 || Mount Lemmon || Mount Lemmon Survey || THM || align=right | 3.5 km || 
|-id=668 bgcolor=#d6d6d6
| 238668 ||  || — || March 9, 2005 || Mount Lemmon || Mount Lemmon Survey || — || align=right | 2.9 km || 
|-id=669 bgcolor=#E9E9E9
| 238669 ||  || — || March 10, 2005 || Mount Lemmon || Mount Lemmon Survey || AST || align=right | 2.7 km || 
|-id=670 bgcolor=#E9E9E9
| 238670 ||  || — || March 7, 2005 || Socorro || LINEAR || BRU || align=right | 3.3 km || 
|-id=671 bgcolor=#d6d6d6
| 238671 ||  || — || March 9, 2005 || Kitt Peak || Spacewatch || KOR || align=right | 1.7 km || 
|-id=672 bgcolor=#d6d6d6
| 238672 ||  || — || March 9, 2005 || Anderson Mesa || LONEOS || — || align=right | 3.7 km || 
|-id=673 bgcolor=#E9E9E9
| 238673 ||  || — || March 10, 2005 || Mount Lemmon || Mount Lemmon Survey || — || align=right | 1.8 km || 
|-id=674 bgcolor=#d6d6d6
| 238674 ||  || — || March 10, 2005 || Mount Lemmon || Mount Lemmon Survey || HYG || align=right | 3.3 km || 
|-id=675 bgcolor=#E9E9E9
| 238675 ||  || — || March 11, 2005 || Mount Lemmon || Mount Lemmon Survey || — || align=right | 3.0 km || 
|-id=676 bgcolor=#d6d6d6
| 238676 ||  || — || March 11, 2005 || Mount Lemmon || Mount Lemmon Survey || — || align=right | 4.8 km || 
|-id=677 bgcolor=#E9E9E9
| 238677 ||  || — || March 8, 2005 || Catalina || CSS || EUN || align=right | 2.0 km || 
|-id=678 bgcolor=#E9E9E9
| 238678 ||  || — || March 13, 2005 || Kitt Peak || Spacewatch || MRX || align=right | 1.3 km || 
|-id=679 bgcolor=#E9E9E9
| 238679 ||  || — || March 8, 2005 || Anderson Mesa || LONEOS || — || align=right | 3.0 km || 
|-id=680 bgcolor=#E9E9E9
| 238680 ||  || — || March 4, 2005 || Kitt Peak || Spacewatch || — || align=right | 3.0 km || 
|-id=681 bgcolor=#d6d6d6
| 238681 ||  || — || March 4, 2005 || Catalina || CSS || — || align=right | 5.4 km || 
|-id=682 bgcolor=#d6d6d6
| 238682 ||  || — || March 10, 2005 || Mount Lemmon || Mount Lemmon Survey || HYG || align=right | 3.3 km || 
|-id=683 bgcolor=#d6d6d6
| 238683 ||  || — || March 9, 2005 || Mount Lemmon || Mount Lemmon Survey || TEL || align=right | 1.4 km || 
|-id=684 bgcolor=#d6d6d6
| 238684 ||  || — || March 10, 2005 || Mount Lemmon || Mount Lemmon Survey || NAE || align=right | 3.6 km || 
|-id=685 bgcolor=#E9E9E9
| 238685 ||  || — || March 11, 2005 || Kitt Peak || Spacewatch || HOF || align=right | 3.5 km || 
|-id=686 bgcolor=#d6d6d6
| 238686 ||  || — || March 11, 2005 || Kitt Peak || Spacewatch || — || align=right | 4.4 km || 
|-id=687 bgcolor=#d6d6d6
| 238687 ||  || — || March 12, 2005 || Kitt Peak || Spacewatch || — || align=right | 3.8 km || 
|-id=688 bgcolor=#d6d6d6
| 238688 ||  || — || March 12, 2005 || Kitt Peak || Spacewatch || KOR || align=right | 1.5 km || 
|-id=689 bgcolor=#E9E9E9
| 238689 ||  || — || March 11, 2005 || Kitt Peak || Spacewatch || — || align=right | 2.9 km || 
|-id=690 bgcolor=#E9E9E9
| 238690 ||  || — || March 11, 2005 || Mount Lemmon || Mount Lemmon Survey || WIT || align=right | 1.2 km || 
|-id=691 bgcolor=#d6d6d6
| 238691 ||  || — || March 13, 2005 || Kitt Peak || Spacewatch || KOR || align=right | 1.7 km || 
|-id=692 bgcolor=#d6d6d6
| 238692 ||  || — || March 14, 2005 || Mount Lemmon || Mount Lemmon Survey || — || align=right | 3.1 km || 
|-id=693 bgcolor=#d6d6d6
| 238693 ||  || — || March 15, 2005 || Catalina || CSS || TIR || align=right | 2.9 km || 
|-id=694 bgcolor=#E9E9E9
| 238694 ||  || — || March 15, 2005 || Kitt Peak || Spacewatch || — || align=right | 3.3 km || 
|-id=695 bgcolor=#d6d6d6
| 238695 ||  || — || March 11, 2005 || Kitt Peak || Spacewatch || — || align=right | 4.8 km || 
|-id=696 bgcolor=#E9E9E9
| 238696 ||  || — || March 3, 2005 || Catalina || CSS || GEF || align=right | 1.7 km || 
|-id=697 bgcolor=#E9E9E9
| 238697 ||  || — || March 8, 2005 || Anderson Mesa || LONEOS || GEF || align=right | 2.1 km || 
|-id=698 bgcolor=#E9E9E9
| 238698 ||  || — || March 8, 2005 || Socorro || LINEAR || — || align=right | 3.8 km || 
|-id=699 bgcolor=#d6d6d6
| 238699 ||  || — || March 10, 2005 || Mount Lemmon || Mount Lemmon Survey || — || align=right | 3.5 km || 
|-id=700 bgcolor=#d6d6d6
| 238700 ||  || — || March 10, 2005 || Mount Lemmon || Mount Lemmon Survey || — || align=right | 4.3 km || 
|}

238701–238800 

|-bgcolor=#d6d6d6
| 238701 ||  || — || March 11, 2005 || Mount Lemmon || Mount Lemmon Survey || KOR || align=right | 1.9 km || 
|-id=702 bgcolor=#d6d6d6
| 238702 ||  || — || March 13, 2005 || Catalina || CSS || — || align=right | 5.3 km || 
|-id=703 bgcolor=#E9E9E9
| 238703 ||  || — || March 31, 2005 || Vail-Jarnac || Jarnac Obs. || — || align=right | 3.6 km || 
|-id=704 bgcolor=#d6d6d6
| 238704 ||  || — || March 31, 2005 || Bergisch Gladbac || Bergisch Gladbach Obs. || KOR || align=right | 1.8 km || 
|-id=705 bgcolor=#d6d6d6
| 238705 ||  || — || April 2, 2005 || Kitt Peak || Spacewatch || — || align=right | 3.5 km || 
|-id=706 bgcolor=#d6d6d6
| 238706 ||  || — || April 4, 2005 || Catalina || CSS || — || align=right | 3.7 km || 
|-id=707 bgcolor=#d6d6d6
| 238707 ||  || — || April 1, 2005 || Anderson Mesa || LONEOS || EOS || align=right | 3.0 km || 
|-id=708 bgcolor=#d6d6d6
| 238708 ||  || — || April 2, 2005 || Mount Lemmon || Mount Lemmon Survey || — || align=right | 4.3 km || 
|-id=709 bgcolor=#FA8072
| 238709 ||  || — || April 4, 2005 || Kitt Peak || Spacewatch || H || align=right data-sort-value="0.88" | 880 m || 
|-id=710 bgcolor=#E9E9E9
| 238710 Halassy ||  ||  || April 4, 2005 || Piszkéstető || K. Sárneczky || HOF || align=right | 3.0 km || 
|-id=711 bgcolor=#d6d6d6
| 238711 ||  || — || April 2, 2005 || Needville || Needville Obs. || CHA || align=right | 3.5 km || 
|-id=712 bgcolor=#d6d6d6
| 238712 ||  || — || April 2, 2005 || Catalina || CSS || URS || align=right | 5.8 km || 
|-id=713 bgcolor=#d6d6d6
| 238713 ||  || — || April 2, 2005 || Siding Spring || SSS || — || align=right | 3.9 km || 
|-id=714 bgcolor=#d6d6d6
| 238714 ||  || — || April 4, 2005 || Mount Lemmon || Mount Lemmon Survey || — || align=right | 4.3 km || 
|-id=715 bgcolor=#d6d6d6
| 238715 ||  || — || April 5, 2005 || Mount Lemmon || Mount Lemmon Survey || CHA || align=right | 2.5 km || 
|-id=716 bgcolor=#d6d6d6
| 238716 ||  || — || April 5, 2005 || Palomar || NEAT || — || align=right | 4.1 km || 
|-id=717 bgcolor=#E9E9E9
| 238717 ||  || — || April 5, 2005 || Mount Lemmon || Mount Lemmon Survey || — || align=right | 3.6 km || 
|-id=718 bgcolor=#d6d6d6
| 238718 ||  || — || April 5, 2005 || Mount Lemmon || Mount Lemmon Survey || KOR || align=right | 1.6 km || 
|-id=719 bgcolor=#d6d6d6
| 238719 ||  || — || April 2, 2005 || Mount Lemmon || Mount Lemmon Survey || ALA || align=right | 6.0 km || 
|-id=720 bgcolor=#d6d6d6
| 238720 ||  || — || April 2, 2005 || Catalina || CSS || — || align=right | 2.3 km || 
|-id=721 bgcolor=#d6d6d6
| 238721 ||  || — || April 2, 2005 || Mount Lemmon || Mount Lemmon Survey || KAR || align=right | 1.4 km || 
|-id=722 bgcolor=#d6d6d6
| 238722 ||  || — || April 5, 2005 || Palomar || NEAT || EUP || align=right | 6.3 km || 
|-id=723 bgcolor=#d6d6d6
| 238723 ||  || — || April 6, 2005 || Catalina || CSS || TIR || align=right | 6.2 km || 
|-id=724 bgcolor=#d6d6d6
| 238724 ||  || — || April 6, 2005 || Mount Lemmon || Mount Lemmon Survey || — || align=right | 3.9 km || 
|-id=725 bgcolor=#E9E9E9
| 238725 ||  || — || April 4, 2005 || Mount Lemmon || Mount Lemmon Survey || — || align=right | 3.4 km || 
|-id=726 bgcolor=#d6d6d6
| 238726 ||  || — || April 4, 2005 || Catalina || CSS || — || align=right | 5.3 km || 
|-id=727 bgcolor=#d6d6d6
| 238727 ||  || — || April 4, 2005 || Catalina || CSS || K-2 || align=right | 1.9 km || 
|-id=728 bgcolor=#d6d6d6
| 238728 ||  || — || April 4, 2005 || Mount Lemmon || Mount Lemmon Survey || EOS || align=right | 4.5 km || 
|-id=729 bgcolor=#d6d6d6
| 238729 ||  || — || April 5, 2005 || Anderson Mesa || LONEOS || — || align=right | 4.4 km || 
|-id=730 bgcolor=#d6d6d6
| 238730 ||  || — || April 9, 2005 || Kitt Peak || Spacewatch || — || align=right | 3.5 km || 
|-id=731 bgcolor=#d6d6d6
| 238731 ||  || — || April 10, 2005 || Kitt Peak || Spacewatch || BRA || align=right | 2.1 km || 
|-id=732 bgcolor=#d6d6d6
| 238732 ||  || — || April 10, 2005 || Mount Lemmon || Mount Lemmon Survey || — || align=right | 2.9 km || 
|-id=733 bgcolor=#d6d6d6
| 238733 ||  || — || April 10, 2005 || Mount Lemmon || Mount Lemmon Survey || — || align=right | 3.5 km || 
|-id=734 bgcolor=#d6d6d6
| 238734 ||  || — || April 11, 2005 || Kitt Peak || Spacewatch || — || align=right | 3.3 km || 
|-id=735 bgcolor=#d6d6d6
| 238735 ||  || — || April 11, 2005 || Mount Lemmon || Mount Lemmon Survey || — || align=right | 3.8 km || 
|-id=736 bgcolor=#E9E9E9
| 238736 ||  || — || April 5, 2005 || Mount Lemmon || Mount Lemmon Survey || HEN || align=right | 1.4 km || 
|-id=737 bgcolor=#d6d6d6
| 238737 ||  || — || April 5, 2005 || Kitt Peak || Spacewatch || — || align=right | 5.0 km || 
|-id=738 bgcolor=#d6d6d6
| 238738 ||  || — || April 11, 2005 || Mount Lemmon || Mount Lemmon Survey || KOR || align=right | 1.8 km || 
|-id=739 bgcolor=#d6d6d6
| 238739 ||  || — || April 12, 2005 || Socorro || LINEAR || HYG || align=right | 4.4 km || 
|-id=740 bgcolor=#d6d6d6
| 238740 ||  || — || April 8, 2005 || Socorro || LINEAR || — || align=right | 5.1 km || 
|-id=741 bgcolor=#d6d6d6
| 238741 ||  || — || April 10, 2005 || Kitt Peak || Spacewatch || — || align=right | 4.2 km || 
|-id=742 bgcolor=#d6d6d6
| 238742 ||  || — || April 10, 2005 || Mount Lemmon || Mount Lemmon Survey || — || align=right | 2.5 km || 
|-id=743 bgcolor=#d6d6d6
| 238743 ||  || — || April 10, 2005 || Mount Lemmon || Mount Lemmon Survey || EOS || align=right | 2.6 km || 
|-id=744 bgcolor=#d6d6d6
| 238744 ||  || — || April 14, 2005 || Kitt Peak || Spacewatch || — || align=right | 4.5 km || 
|-id=745 bgcolor=#d6d6d6
| 238745 ||  || — || April 10, 2005 || Kitt Peak || Spacewatch || CHA || align=right | 3.0 km || 
|-id=746 bgcolor=#d6d6d6
| 238746 ||  || — || April 11, 2005 || Kitt Peak || Spacewatch || — || align=right | 2.7 km || 
|-id=747 bgcolor=#d6d6d6
| 238747 ||  || — || April 12, 2005 || Kitt Peak || Spacewatch || CHA || align=right | 2.7 km || 
|-id=748 bgcolor=#d6d6d6
| 238748 ||  || — || April 10, 2005 || Mount Lemmon || Mount Lemmon Survey || EOS || align=right | 2.6 km || 
|-id=749 bgcolor=#d6d6d6
| 238749 ||  || — || April 13, 2005 || Kitt Peak || Spacewatch || — || align=right | 4.0 km || 
|-id=750 bgcolor=#d6d6d6
| 238750 ||  || — || April 14, 2005 || Kitt Peak || Spacewatch || EOS || align=right | 2.2 km || 
|-id=751 bgcolor=#d6d6d6
| 238751 ||  || — || April 2, 2005 || Mount Lemmon || Mount Lemmon Survey || HYG || align=right | 3.7 km || 
|-id=752 bgcolor=#d6d6d6
| 238752 ||  || — || April 30, 2005 || Mayhill || A. Lowe || ALA || align=right | 5.4 km || 
|-id=753 bgcolor=#d6d6d6
| 238753 ||  || — || April 30, 2005 || Palomar || NEAT || — || align=right | 3.4 km || 
|-id=754 bgcolor=#d6d6d6
| 238754 ||  || — || April 16, 2005 || Kitt Peak || Spacewatch || KOR || align=right | 1.5 km || 
|-id=755 bgcolor=#d6d6d6
| 238755 ||  || — || May 3, 2005 || Socorro || LINEAR || EOS || align=right | 2.9 km || 
|-id=756 bgcolor=#d6d6d6
| 238756 ||  || — || May 2, 2005 || Kitt Peak || Spacewatch || — || align=right | 3.3 km || 
|-id=757 bgcolor=#d6d6d6
| 238757 ||  || — || May 2, 2005 || Kitt Peak || Spacewatch || — || align=right | 3.5 km || 
|-id=758 bgcolor=#E9E9E9
| 238758 ||  || — || May 4, 2005 || Kitt Peak || Spacewatch || — || align=right | 3.2 km || 
|-id=759 bgcolor=#d6d6d6
| 238759 ||  || — || May 4, 2005 || Palomar || NEAT || EOS || align=right | 2.5 km || 
|-id=760 bgcolor=#d6d6d6
| 238760 ||  || — || May 3, 2005 || Kitt Peak || Spacewatch || — || align=right | 3.6 km || 
|-id=761 bgcolor=#d6d6d6
| 238761 ||  || — || May 4, 2005 || Mount Lemmon || Mount Lemmon Survey || THM || align=right | 2.3 km || 
|-id=762 bgcolor=#d6d6d6
| 238762 ||  || — || May 8, 2005 || Kitt Peak || Spacewatch || — || align=right | 3.8 km || 
|-id=763 bgcolor=#d6d6d6
| 238763 ||  || — || May 6, 2005 || Socorro || LINEAR || — || align=right | 3.3 km || 
|-id=764 bgcolor=#d6d6d6
| 238764 ||  || — || May 3, 2005 || Kitt Peak || Spacewatch || — || align=right | 3.8 km || 
|-id=765 bgcolor=#d6d6d6
| 238765 ||  || — || May 6, 2005 || Mount Lemmon || Mount Lemmon Survey || TRP || align=right | 3.6 km || 
|-id=766 bgcolor=#d6d6d6
| 238766 ||  || — || May 8, 2005 || Socorro || LINEAR || — || align=right | 4.1 km || 
|-id=767 bgcolor=#d6d6d6
| 238767 ||  || — || May 8, 2005 || Mount Lemmon || Mount Lemmon Survey || EOS || align=right | 2.4 km || 
|-id=768 bgcolor=#d6d6d6
| 238768 ||  || — || May 9, 2005 || Mount Lemmon || Mount Lemmon Survey || — || align=right | 3.3 km || 
|-id=769 bgcolor=#d6d6d6
| 238769 ||  || — || May 11, 2005 || Palomar || NEAT || — || align=right | 2.8 km || 
|-id=770 bgcolor=#d6d6d6
| 238770 ||  || — || May 11, 2005 || Palomar || NEAT || EOS || align=right | 2.8 km || 
|-id=771 bgcolor=#d6d6d6
| 238771 Juhászbalázs ||  ||  || May 12, 2005 || Piszkéstető || K. Sárneczky || — || align=right | 3.5 km || 
|-id=772 bgcolor=#d6d6d6
| 238772 ||  || — || May 7, 2005 || Mount Lemmon || Mount Lemmon Survey || EOS || align=right | 3.0 km || 
|-id=773 bgcolor=#d6d6d6
| 238773 ||  || — || May 8, 2005 || Kitt Peak || Spacewatch || — || align=right | 3.6 km || 
|-id=774 bgcolor=#d6d6d6
| 238774 ||  || — || May 11, 2005 || Palomar || NEAT || — || align=right | 3.1 km || 
|-id=775 bgcolor=#d6d6d6
| 238775 ||  || — || May 12, 2005 || Socorro || LINEAR || — || align=right | 4.9 km || 
|-id=776 bgcolor=#d6d6d6
| 238776 ||  || — || May 12, 2005 || Kitt Peak || Spacewatch || — || align=right | 3.1 km || 
|-id=777 bgcolor=#d6d6d6
| 238777 ||  || — || May 13, 2005 || Kitt Peak || Spacewatch || — || align=right | 3.8 km || 
|-id=778 bgcolor=#d6d6d6
| 238778 ||  || — || May 13, 2005 || Mount Lemmon || Mount Lemmon Survey || — || align=right | 3.8 km || 
|-id=779 bgcolor=#d6d6d6
| 238779 ||  || — || May 13, 2005 || Catalina || CSS || — || align=right | 2.2 km || 
|-id=780 bgcolor=#d6d6d6
| 238780 ||  || — || May 15, 2005 || Mount Lemmon || Mount Lemmon Survey || EOS || align=right | 2.6 km || 
|-id=781 bgcolor=#d6d6d6
| 238781 ||  || — || May 15, 2005 || Palomar || NEAT || — || align=right | 2.8 km || 
|-id=782 bgcolor=#d6d6d6
| 238782 ||  || — || May 15, 2005 || Palomar || NEAT || ALA || align=right | 4.5 km || 
|-id=783 bgcolor=#d6d6d6
| 238783 ||  || — || May 3, 2005 || Kitt Peak || Spacewatch || — || align=right | 3.7 km || 
|-id=784 bgcolor=#d6d6d6
| 238784 ||  || — || May 3, 2005 || Catalina || CSS || — || align=right | 5.2 km || 
|-id=785 bgcolor=#d6d6d6
| 238785 ||  || — || May 8, 2005 || Kitt Peak || Spacewatch || — || align=right | 3.5 km || 
|-id=786 bgcolor=#E9E9E9
| 238786 ||  || — || May 8, 2005 || Kitt Peak || Spacewatch || PAD || align=right | 2.6 km || 
|-id=787 bgcolor=#d6d6d6
| 238787 ||  || — || May 4, 2005 || Anderson Mesa || LONEOS || — || align=right | 4.1 km || 
|-id=788 bgcolor=#d6d6d6
| 238788 ||  || — || May 17, 2005 || Mount Lemmon || Mount Lemmon Survey || — || align=right | 3.0 km || 
|-id=789 bgcolor=#d6d6d6
| 238789 ||  || — || May 19, 2005 || Mount Lemmon || Mount Lemmon Survey || — || align=right | 4.2 km || 
|-id=790 bgcolor=#d6d6d6
| 238790 ||  || — || May 30, 2005 || Reedy Creek || J. Broughton || TIR || align=right | 4.2 km || 
|-id=791 bgcolor=#d6d6d6
| 238791 ||  || — || May 30, 2005 || Siding Spring || SSS || — || align=right | 2.8 km || 
|-id=792 bgcolor=#d6d6d6
| 238792 ||  || — || May 16, 2005 || Mount Lemmon || Mount Lemmon Survey || — || align=right | 3.2 km || 
|-id=793 bgcolor=#d6d6d6
| 238793 ||  || — || May 20, 2005 || Mount Lemmon || Mount Lemmon Survey || NAE || align=right | 3.7 km || 
|-id=794 bgcolor=#d6d6d6
| 238794 ||  || — || June 1, 2005 || Mount Lemmon || Mount Lemmon Survey || — || align=right | 4.9 km || 
|-id=795 bgcolor=#d6d6d6
| 238795 ||  || — || June 1, 2005 || Kitt Peak || Spacewatch || EOS || align=right | 3.5 km || 
|-id=796 bgcolor=#d6d6d6
| 238796 ||  || — || June 3, 2005 || Kitt Peak || Spacewatch || — || align=right | 2.8 km || 
|-id=797 bgcolor=#d6d6d6
| 238797 ||  || — || June 6, 2005 || Kitt Peak || Spacewatch || — || align=right | 4.2 km || 
|-id=798 bgcolor=#d6d6d6
| 238798 ||  || — || June 9, 2005 || Catalina || CSS || — || align=right | 4.9 km || 
|-id=799 bgcolor=#d6d6d6
| 238799 ||  || — || June 8, 2005 || Kitt Peak || Spacewatch || — || align=right | 4.0 km || 
|-id=800 bgcolor=#d6d6d6
| 238800 ||  || — || June 9, 2005 || Kitt Peak || Spacewatch || LAU || align=right | 1.1 km || 
|}

238801–238900 

|-bgcolor=#d6d6d6
| 238801 ||  || — || June 13, 2005 || Mount Lemmon || Mount Lemmon Survey || — || align=right | 5.1 km || 
|-id=802 bgcolor=#d6d6d6
| 238802 ||  || — || June 11, 2005 || Kitt Peak || Spacewatch || — || align=right | 3.9 km || 
|-id=803 bgcolor=#d6d6d6
| 238803 ||  || — || June 1, 2005 || Mount Lemmon || Mount Lemmon Survey || — || align=right | 6.1 km || 
|-id=804 bgcolor=#d6d6d6
| 238804 ||  || — || June 13, 2005 || Mount Lemmon || Mount Lemmon Survey || SHU3:2 || align=right | 7.6 km || 
|-id=805 bgcolor=#d6d6d6
| 238805 ||  || — || June 8, 2005 || Kitt Peak || Spacewatch || THM || align=right | 3.3 km || 
|-id=806 bgcolor=#d6d6d6
| 238806 ||  || — || June 16, 2005 || Reedy Creek || J. Broughton || — || align=right | 6.1 km || 
|-id=807 bgcolor=#d6d6d6
| 238807 ||  || — || June 27, 2005 || Mount Lemmon || Mount Lemmon Survey || — || align=right | 6.4 km || 
|-id=808 bgcolor=#d6d6d6
| 238808 ||  || — || June 27, 2005 || Kitt Peak || Spacewatch || — || align=right | 2.8 km || 
|-id=809 bgcolor=#d6d6d6
| 238809 ||  || — || June 28, 2005 || Kitt Peak || Spacewatch || — || align=right | 3.2 km || 
|-id=810 bgcolor=#d6d6d6
| 238810 ||  || — || June 29, 2005 || Kitt Peak || Spacewatch || — || align=right | 5.0 km || 
|-id=811 bgcolor=#fefefe
| 238811 ||  || — || July 6, 2005 || Siding Spring || SSS || H || align=right data-sort-value="0.87" | 870 m || 
|-id=812 bgcolor=#d6d6d6
| 238812 ||  || — || July 4, 2005 || Socorro || LINEAR || — || align=right | 6.5 km || 
|-id=813 bgcolor=#d6d6d6
| 238813 ||  || — || July 4, 2005 || Palomar || NEAT || — || align=right | 5.1 km || 
|-id=814 bgcolor=#d6d6d6
| 238814 ||  || — || July 15, 2005 || Kitt Peak || Spacewatch || — || align=right | 3.5 km || 
|-id=815 bgcolor=#fefefe
| 238815 ||  || — || July 30, 2005 || Palomar || NEAT || H || align=right data-sort-value="0.78" | 780 m || 
|-id=816 bgcolor=#d6d6d6
| 238816 ||  || — || August 4, 2005 || Palomar || NEAT || EMA || align=right | 5.2 km || 
|-id=817 bgcolor=#d6d6d6
| 238817 Titeuf ||  ||  || August 10, 2005 || Vicques || M. Ory || — || align=right | 3.0 km || 
|-id=818 bgcolor=#d6d6d6
| 238818 ||  || — || August 6, 2005 || Siding Spring || SSS || HIL3:2 || align=right | 8.0 km || 
|-id=819 bgcolor=#d6d6d6
| 238819 ||  || — || August 22, 2005 || Palomar || NEAT || 3:2 || align=right | 7.1 km || 
|-id=820 bgcolor=#fefefe
| 238820 ||  || — || August 24, 2005 || Siding Spring || SSS || H || align=right data-sort-value="0.92" | 920 m || 
|-id=821 bgcolor=#fefefe
| 238821 ||  || — || August 25, 2005 || Palomar || NEAT || FLO || align=right data-sort-value="0.99" | 990 m || 
|-id=822 bgcolor=#fefefe
| 238822 ||  || — || August 26, 2005 || Anderson Mesa || LONEOS || — || align=right | 2.4 km || 
|-id=823 bgcolor=#d6d6d6
| 238823 ||  || — || August 29, 2005 || Anderson Mesa || LONEOS || — || align=right | 4.1 km || 
|-id=824 bgcolor=#d6d6d6
| 238824 ||  || — || August 25, 2005 || Palomar || NEAT || — || align=right | 3.4 km || 
|-id=825 bgcolor=#fefefe
| 238825 ||  || — || September 26, 2005 || Socorro || LINEAR || PHO || align=right | 3.5 km || 
|-id=826 bgcolor=#d6d6d6
| 238826 ||  || — || September 26, 2005 || Kitt Peak || Spacewatch || — || align=right | 4.6 km || 
|-id=827 bgcolor=#d6d6d6
| 238827 ||  || — || September 24, 2005 || Kitt Peak || Spacewatch || 3:2 || align=right | 5.4 km || 
|-id=828 bgcolor=#fefefe
| 238828 ||  || — || September 25, 2005 || Kitt Peak || Spacewatch || FLO || align=right data-sort-value="0.71" | 710 m || 
|-id=829 bgcolor=#d6d6d6
| 238829 ||  || — || September 29, 2005 || Palomar || NEAT || HIL3:2 || align=right | 7.3 km || 
|-id=830 bgcolor=#fefefe
| 238830 ||  || — || October 3, 2005 || Socorro || LINEAR || FLO || align=right | 1.2 km || 
|-id=831 bgcolor=#fefefe
| 238831 ||  || — || October 4, 2005 || Mount Lemmon || Mount Lemmon Survey || — || align=right data-sort-value="0.69" | 690 m || 
|-id=832 bgcolor=#fefefe
| 238832 ||  || — || October 1, 2005 || Kitt Peak || Spacewatch || NYS || align=right | 1.4 km || 
|-id=833 bgcolor=#fefefe
| 238833 ||  || — || October 3, 2005 || Socorro || LINEAR || — || align=right | 1.1 km || 
|-id=834 bgcolor=#d6d6d6
| 238834 ||  || — || October 10, 2005 || Kitt Peak || Spacewatch || SHU3:2 || align=right | 6.7 km || 
|-id=835 bgcolor=#fefefe
| 238835 ||  || — || October 6, 2005 || Catalina || CSS || — || align=right | 2.9 km || 
|-id=836 bgcolor=#fefefe
| 238836 ||  || — || October 13, 2005 || Kitt Peak || Spacewatch || FLO || align=right data-sort-value="0.94" | 940 m || 
|-id=837 bgcolor=#fefefe
| 238837 ||  || — || October 23, 2005 || Goodricke-Pigott || R. A. Tucker || — || align=right data-sort-value="0.79" | 790 m || 
|-id=838 bgcolor=#fefefe
| 238838 ||  || — || October 21, 2005 || Palomar || NEAT || — || align=right | 1.1 km || 
|-id=839 bgcolor=#fefefe
| 238839 ||  || — || October 22, 2005 || Kitt Peak || Spacewatch || FLO || align=right | 1.5 km || 
|-id=840 bgcolor=#fefefe
| 238840 ||  || — || October 23, 2005 || Catalina || CSS || — || align=right | 2.1 km || 
|-id=841 bgcolor=#fefefe
| 238841 ||  || — || October 24, 2005 || Kitt Peak || Spacewatch || MAS || align=right data-sort-value="0.81" | 810 m || 
|-id=842 bgcolor=#fefefe
| 238842 ||  || — || October 26, 2005 || Kitt Peak || Spacewatch || — || align=right data-sort-value="0.87" | 870 m || 
|-id=843 bgcolor=#fefefe
| 238843 ||  || — || October 24, 2005 || Kitt Peak || Spacewatch || — || align=right data-sort-value="0.87" | 870 m || 
|-id=844 bgcolor=#fefefe
| 238844 ||  || — || October 25, 2005 || Mount Lemmon || Mount Lemmon Survey || — || align=right data-sort-value="0.81" | 810 m || 
|-id=845 bgcolor=#fefefe
| 238845 ||  || — || October 24, 2005 || Kitt Peak || Spacewatch || — || align=right data-sort-value="0.65" | 650 m || 
|-id=846 bgcolor=#fefefe
| 238846 ||  || — || October 25, 2005 || Kitt Peak || Spacewatch || — || align=right data-sort-value="0.89" | 890 m || 
|-id=847 bgcolor=#d6d6d6
| 238847 ||  || — || October 24, 2005 || Kitt Peak || Spacewatch || SHU3:2 || align=right | 8.4 km || 
|-id=848 bgcolor=#fefefe
| 238848 ||  || — || October 30, 2005 || Catalina || CSS || — || align=right data-sort-value="0.71" | 710 m || 
|-id=849 bgcolor=#d6d6d6
| 238849 ||  || — || October 24, 2005 || Palomar || NEAT || THB || align=right | 5.3 km || 
|-id=850 bgcolor=#E9E9E9
| 238850 ||  || — || October 24, 2005 || Mauna Kea || D. J. Tholen || PAD || align=right | 3.2 km || 
|-id=851 bgcolor=#FA8072
| 238851 ||  || — || November 1, 2005 || Socorro || LINEAR || — || align=right | 2.0 km || 
|-id=852 bgcolor=#FA8072
| 238852 ||  || — || November 12, 2005 || Socorro || LINEAR || PHO || align=right | 1.2 km || 
|-id=853 bgcolor=#fefefe
| 238853 ||  || — || November 4, 2005 || Kitt Peak || Spacewatch || — || align=right | 1.3 km || 
|-id=854 bgcolor=#fefefe
| 238854 ||  || — || November 4, 2005 || Mount Lemmon || Mount Lemmon Survey || — || align=right data-sort-value="0.98" | 980 m || 
|-id=855 bgcolor=#fefefe
| 238855 ||  || — || November 21, 2005 || Catalina || CSS || NYS || align=right | 2.1 km || 
|-id=856 bgcolor=#fefefe
| 238856 ||  || — || November 25, 2005 || Kitt Peak || Spacewatch || — || align=right data-sort-value="0.95" | 950 m || 
|-id=857 bgcolor=#fefefe
| 238857 ||  || — || November 28, 2005 || Mount Lemmon || Mount Lemmon Survey || FLO || align=right data-sort-value="0.95" | 950 m || 
|-id=858 bgcolor=#fefefe
| 238858 ||  || — || November 28, 2005 || Kitt Peak || Spacewatch || FLO || align=right data-sort-value="0.71" | 710 m || 
|-id=859 bgcolor=#fefefe
| 238859 ||  || — || November 30, 2005 || Socorro || LINEAR || — || align=right | 1.1 km || 
|-id=860 bgcolor=#fefefe
| 238860 ||  || — || November 25, 2005 || Mount Lemmon || Mount Lemmon Survey || — || align=right | 2.5 km || 
|-id=861 bgcolor=#fefefe
| 238861 ||  || — || November 26, 2005 || Mount Lemmon || Mount Lemmon Survey || — || align=right | 1.0 km || 
|-id=862 bgcolor=#fefefe
| 238862 ||  || — || November 28, 2005 || Socorro || LINEAR || — || align=right | 1.8 km || 
|-id=863 bgcolor=#fefefe
| 238863 ||  || — || November 26, 2005 || Mount Lemmon || Mount Lemmon Survey || — || align=right | 1.1 km || 
|-id=864 bgcolor=#fefefe
| 238864 ||  || — || November 21, 2005 || Catalina || CSS || — || align=right data-sort-value="0.91" | 910 m || 
|-id=865 bgcolor=#fefefe
| 238865 ||  || — || December 1, 2005 || Mount Lemmon || Mount Lemmon Survey || FLO || align=right data-sort-value="0.68" | 680 m || 
|-id=866 bgcolor=#fefefe
| 238866 ||  || — || December 1, 2005 || Kitt Peak || Spacewatch || NYS || align=right data-sort-value="0.79" | 790 m || 
|-id=867 bgcolor=#fefefe
| 238867 ||  || — || December 2, 2005 || Kitt Peak || Spacewatch || — || align=right data-sort-value="0.76" | 760 m || 
|-id=868 bgcolor=#fefefe
| 238868 ||  || — || December 4, 2005 || Kitt Peak || Spacewatch || NYS || align=right data-sort-value="0.89" | 890 m || 
|-id=869 bgcolor=#fefefe
| 238869 ||  || — || December 4, 2005 || Kitt Peak || Spacewatch || NYS || align=right data-sort-value="0.80" | 800 m || 
|-id=870 bgcolor=#fefefe
| 238870 ||  || — || December 4, 2005 || Kitt Peak || Spacewatch || — || align=right | 1.0 km || 
|-id=871 bgcolor=#fefefe
| 238871 ||  || — || December 2, 2005 || Kitt Peak || Spacewatch || FLO || align=right | 1.5 km || 
|-id=872 bgcolor=#fefefe
| 238872 ||  || — || December 5, 2005 || Socorro || LINEAR || — || align=right | 1.1 km || 
|-id=873 bgcolor=#fefefe
| 238873 ||  || — || December 10, 2005 || Kitt Peak || Spacewatch || NYS || align=right | 1.6 km || 
|-id=874 bgcolor=#fefefe
| 238874 ||  || — || December 21, 2005 || Kitt Peak || Spacewatch || — || align=right data-sort-value="0.91" | 910 m || 
|-id=875 bgcolor=#fefefe
| 238875 ||  || — || December 22, 2005 || Kitt Peak || Spacewatch || MAS || align=right data-sort-value="0.80" | 800 m || 
|-id=876 bgcolor=#fefefe
| 238876 ||  || — || December 24, 2005 || Kitt Peak || Spacewatch || NYS || align=right data-sort-value="0.82" | 820 m || 
|-id=877 bgcolor=#fefefe
| 238877 ||  || — || December 24, 2005 || Kitt Peak || Spacewatch || NYS || align=right data-sort-value="0.80" | 800 m || 
|-id=878 bgcolor=#fefefe
| 238878 ||  || — || December 22, 2005 || Kitt Peak || Spacewatch || — || align=right data-sort-value="0.96" | 960 m || 
|-id=879 bgcolor=#fefefe
| 238879 ||  || — || December 25, 2005 || Kitt Peak || Spacewatch || — || align=right data-sort-value="0.81" | 810 m || 
|-id=880 bgcolor=#fefefe
| 238880 ||  || — || December 22, 2005 || Kitt Peak || Spacewatch || NYS || align=right data-sort-value="0.82" | 820 m || 
|-id=881 bgcolor=#fefefe
| 238881 ||  || — || December 27, 2005 || Eskridge || Farpoint Obs. || — || align=right | 2.0 km || 
|-id=882 bgcolor=#E9E9E9
| 238882 ||  || — || December 24, 2005 || Kitt Peak || Spacewatch || MIT || align=right | 3.3 km || 
|-id=883 bgcolor=#fefefe
| 238883 ||  || — || December 24, 2005 || Kitt Peak || Spacewatch || NYS || align=right data-sort-value="0.62" | 620 m || 
|-id=884 bgcolor=#fefefe
| 238884 ||  || — || December 22, 2005 || Kitt Peak || Spacewatch || — || align=right data-sort-value="0.94" | 940 m || 
|-id=885 bgcolor=#fefefe
| 238885 ||  || — || December 25, 2005 || Mount Lemmon || Mount Lemmon Survey || V || align=right data-sort-value="0.97" | 970 m || 
|-id=886 bgcolor=#fefefe
| 238886 ||  || — || December 24, 2005 || Kitt Peak || Spacewatch || — || align=right data-sort-value="0.95" | 950 m || 
|-id=887 bgcolor=#fefefe
| 238887 ||  || — || December 25, 2005 || Kitt Peak || Spacewatch || NYS || align=right data-sort-value="0.70" | 700 m || 
|-id=888 bgcolor=#fefefe
| 238888 ||  || — || December 24, 2005 || Kitt Peak || Spacewatch || — || align=right data-sort-value="0.91" | 910 m || 
|-id=889 bgcolor=#fefefe
| 238889 ||  || — || December 24, 2005 || Kitt Peak || Spacewatch || — || align=right | 1.1 km || 
|-id=890 bgcolor=#fefefe
| 238890 ||  || — || December 25, 2005 || Mount Lemmon || Mount Lemmon Survey || — || align=right data-sort-value="0.94" | 940 m || 
|-id=891 bgcolor=#fefefe
| 238891 ||  || — || December 26, 2005 || Mount Lemmon || Mount Lemmon Survey || NYS || align=right data-sort-value="0.76" | 760 m || 
|-id=892 bgcolor=#fefefe
| 238892 ||  || — || December 26, 2005 || Catalina || CSS || — || align=right | 1.2 km || 
|-id=893 bgcolor=#fefefe
| 238893 ||  || — || December 26, 2005 || Catalina || CSS || — || align=right data-sort-value="0.95" | 950 m || 
|-id=894 bgcolor=#fefefe
| 238894 ||  || — || December 26, 2005 || Mount Lemmon || Mount Lemmon Survey || FLO || align=right data-sort-value="0.92" | 920 m || 
|-id=895 bgcolor=#fefefe
| 238895 ||  || — || December 24, 2005 || Socorro || LINEAR || FLO || align=right data-sort-value="0.87" | 870 m || 
|-id=896 bgcolor=#fefefe
| 238896 ||  || — || December 26, 2005 || Kitt Peak || Spacewatch || NYS || align=right | 1.5 km || 
|-id=897 bgcolor=#fefefe
| 238897 ||  || — || December 25, 2005 || Kitt Peak || Spacewatch || NYS || align=right data-sort-value="0.69" | 690 m || 
|-id=898 bgcolor=#fefefe
| 238898 ||  || — || December 29, 2005 || Catalina || CSS || FLO || align=right data-sort-value="0.85" | 850 m || 
|-id=899 bgcolor=#fefefe
| 238899 ||  || — || December 29, 2005 || Kitt Peak || Spacewatch || NYS || align=right data-sort-value="0.73" | 730 m || 
|-id=900 bgcolor=#fefefe
| 238900 ||  || — || December 28, 2005 || Kitt Peak || Spacewatch || — || align=right data-sort-value="0.96" | 960 m || 
|}

238901–239000 

|-bgcolor=#E9E9E9
| 238901 ||  || — || December 23, 2005 || Socorro || LINEAR || EUN || align=right | 2.8 km || 
|-id=902 bgcolor=#fefefe
| 238902 ||  || — || December 27, 2005 || Kitt Peak || Spacewatch || FLO || align=right data-sort-value="0.71" | 710 m || 
|-id=903 bgcolor=#fefefe
| 238903 ||  || — || December 27, 2005 || Catalina || CSS || — || align=right | 3.6 km || 
|-id=904 bgcolor=#fefefe
| 238904 ||  || — || December 28, 2005 || Kitt Peak || Spacewatch || EUT || align=right data-sort-value="0.79" | 790 m || 
|-id=905 bgcolor=#fefefe
| 238905 ||  || — || December 30, 2005 || Kitt Peak || Spacewatch || NYS || align=right data-sort-value="0.73" | 730 m || 
|-id=906 bgcolor=#fefefe
| 238906 ||  || — || December 30, 2005 || Kitt Peak || Spacewatch || — || align=right | 1.2 km || 
|-id=907 bgcolor=#fefefe
| 238907 ||  || — || December 26, 2005 || Mount Lemmon || Mount Lemmon Survey || — || align=right | 1.1 km || 
|-id=908 bgcolor=#fefefe
| 238908 ||  || — || December 25, 2005 || Kitt Peak || Spacewatch || NYS || align=right | 1.7 km || 
|-id=909 bgcolor=#fefefe
| 238909 ||  || — || December 25, 2005 || Mount Lemmon || Mount Lemmon Survey || V || align=right | 1.0 km || 
|-id=910 bgcolor=#E9E9E9
| 238910 ||  || — || December 25, 2005 || Mount Lemmon || Mount Lemmon Survey || — || align=right | 1.8 km || 
|-id=911 bgcolor=#fefefe
| 238911 ||  || — || January 3, 2006 || Socorro || LINEAR || — || align=right | 1.2 km || 
|-id=912 bgcolor=#fefefe
| 238912 ||  || — || January 2, 2006 || Catalina || CSS || — || align=right | 1.6 km || 
|-id=913 bgcolor=#fefefe
| 238913 ||  || — || January 3, 2006 || Socorro || LINEAR || — || align=right | 1.4 km || 
|-id=914 bgcolor=#fefefe
| 238914 ||  || — || January 4, 2006 || Mount Lemmon || Mount Lemmon Survey || SUL || align=right | 2.0 km || 
|-id=915 bgcolor=#fefefe
| 238915 ||  || — || January 5, 2006 || Mount Lemmon || Mount Lemmon Survey || — || align=right | 1.0 km || 
|-id=916 bgcolor=#fefefe
| 238916 ||  || — || January 4, 2006 || Kitt Peak || Spacewatch || NYS || align=right data-sort-value="0.63" | 630 m || 
|-id=917 bgcolor=#fefefe
| 238917 ||  || — || January 5, 2006 || Kitt Peak || Spacewatch || — || align=right data-sort-value="0.92" | 920 m || 
|-id=918 bgcolor=#fefefe
| 238918 ||  || — || January 5, 2006 || Catalina || CSS || — || align=right data-sort-value="0.86" | 860 m || 
|-id=919 bgcolor=#fefefe
| 238919 ||  || — || January 6, 2006 || Anderson Mesa || LONEOS || NYS || align=right data-sort-value="0.86" | 860 m || 
|-id=920 bgcolor=#fefefe
| 238920 ||  || — || January 4, 2006 || Kitt Peak || Spacewatch || MAS || align=right data-sort-value="0.94" | 940 m || 
|-id=921 bgcolor=#E9E9E9
| 238921 ||  || — || January 4, 2006 || Kitt Peak || Spacewatch || — || align=right | 1.8 km || 
|-id=922 bgcolor=#fefefe
| 238922 ||  || — || January 5, 2006 || Anderson Mesa || LONEOS || — || align=right | 1.1 km || 
|-id=923 bgcolor=#fefefe
| 238923 ||  || — || January 6, 2006 || Kitt Peak || Spacewatch || NYS || align=right data-sort-value="0.75" | 750 m || 
|-id=924 bgcolor=#fefefe
| 238924 ||  || — || January 8, 2006 || Mount Lemmon || Mount Lemmon Survey || V || align=right data-sort-value="0.97" | 970 m || 
|-id=925 bgcolor=#fefefe
| 238925 ||  || — || January 5, 2006 || Kitt Peak || Spacewatch || — || align=right data-sort-value="0.96" | 960 m || 
|-id=926 bgcolor=#fefefe
| 238926 ||  || — || January 5, 2006 || Mount Lemmon || Mount Lemmon Survey || V || align=right data-sort-value="0.95" | 950 m || 
|-id=927 bgcolor=#fefefe
| 238927 ||  || — || January 10, 2006 || Kitt Peak || Spacewatch || — || align=right | 1.0 km || 
|-id=928 bgcolor=#E9E9E9
| 238928 ||  || — || January 5, 2006 || Catalina || CSS || GER || align=right | 1.5 km || 
|-id=929 bgcolor=#fefefe
| 238929 ||  || — || January 5, 2006 || Anderson Mesa || LONEOS || — || align=right | 1.0 km || 
|-id=930 bgcolor=#fefefe
| 238930 ||  || — || January 6, 2006 || Anderson Mesa || LONEOS || ERI || align=right | 2.6 km || 
|-id=931 bgcolor=#fefefe
| 238931 ||  || — || January 12, 2006 || Palomar || NEAT || NYS || align=right | 1.2 km || 
|-id=932 bgcolor=#fefefe
| 238932 ||  || — || January 6, 2006 || Mount Lemmon || Mount Lemmon Survey || — || align=right | 1.1 km || 
|-id=933 bgcolor=#fefefe
| 238933 ||  || — || January 7, 2006 || Anderson Mesa || LONEOS || — || align=right | 1.1 km || 
|-id=934 bgcolor=#fefefe
| 238934 ||  || — || January 6, 2006 || Mount Lemmon || Mount Lemmon Survey || — || align=right data-sort-value="0.89" | 890 m || 
|-id=935 bgcolor=#fefefe
| 238935 ||  || — || January 7, 2006 || Mount Lemmon || Mount Lemmon Survey || — || align=right | 1.0 km || 
|-id=936 bgcolor=#fefefe
| 238936 ||  || — || January 20, 2006 || Catalina || CSS || — || align=right | 1.2 km || 
|-id=937 bgcolor=#fefefe
| 238937 ||  || — || January 20, 2006 || Kitt Peak || Spacewatch || MAS || align=right data-sort-value="0.76" | 760 m || 
|-id=938 bgcolor=#fefefe
| 238938 ||  || — || January 20, 2006 || Kitt Peak || Spacewatch || ERI || align=right | 2.5 km || 
|-id=939 bgcolor=#fefefe
| 238939 ||  || — || January 22, 2006 || Anderson Mesa || LONEOS || — || align=right | 2.1 km || 
|-id=940 bgcolor=#fefefe
| 238940 ||  || — || January 22, 2006 || Anderson Mesa || LONEOS || V || align=right data-sort-value="0.95" | 950 m || 
|-id=941 bgcolor=#fefefe
| 238941 ||  || — || January 22, 2006 || Mount Lemmon || Mount Lemmon Survey || — || align=right | 1.6 km || 
|-id=942 bgcolor=#fefefe
| 238942 ||  || — || January 22, 2006 || Mount Lemmon || Mount Lemmon Survey || MAS || align=right data-sort-value="0.75" | 750 m || 
|-id=943 bgcolor=#fefefe
| 238943 ||  || — || January 22, 2006 || Anderson Mesa || LONEOS || V || align=right | 1.1 km || 
|-id=944 bgcolor=#fefefe
| 238944 ||  || — || January 23, 2006 || Mount Lemmon || Mount Lemmon Survey || MAS || align=right data-sort-value="0.84" | 840 m || 
|-id=945 bgcolor=#fefefe
| 238945 ||  || — || January 22, 2006 || Anderson Mesa || LONEOS || V || align=right | 1.00 km || 
|-id=946 bgcolor=#fefefe
| 238946 ||  || — || January 22, 2006 || Anderson Mesa || LONEOS || NYS || align=right data-sort-value="0.95" | 950 m || 
|-id=947 bgcolor=#fefefe
| 238947 ||  || — || January 21, 2006 || Kitt Peak || Spacewatch || V || align=right data-sort-value="0.95" | 950 m || 
|-id=948 bgcolor=#fefefe
| 238948 ||  || — || January 23, 2006 || Kitt Peak || Spacewatch || MAS || align=right data-sort-value="0.98" | 980 m || 
|-id=949 bgcolor=#fefefe
| 238949 ||  || — || January 23, 2006 || Kitt Peak || Spacewatch || NYS || align=right data-sort-value="0.96" | 960 m || 
|-id=950 bgcolor=#fefefe
| 238950 ||  || — || January 23, 2006 || Kitt Peak || Spacewatch || MAS || align=right data-sort-value="0.96" | 960 m || 
|-id=951 bgcolor=#fefefe
| 238951 ||  || — || January 25, 2006 || Kitt Peak || Spacewatch || NYS || align=right data-sort-value="0.87" | 870 m || 
|-id=952 bgcolor=#fefefe
| 238952 ||  || — || January 26, 2006 || Kitt Peak || Spacewatch || NYS || align=right | 1.0 km || 
|-id=953 bgcolor=#fefefe
| 238953 ||  || — || January 23, 2006 || Kitt Peak || Spacewatch || FLO || align=right data-sort-value="0.91" | 910 m || 
|-id=954 bgcolor=#E9E9E9
| 238954 ||  || — || January 23, 2006 || Kitt Peak || Spacewatch || — || align=right | 2.7 km || 
|-id=955 bgcolor=#fefefe
| 238955 ||  || — || January 23, 2006 || Kitt Peak || Spacewatch || NYS || align=right | 1.1 km || 
|-id=956 bgcolor=#fefefe
| 238956 ||  || — || January 24, 2006 || Socorro || LINEAR || V || align=right | 1.1 km || 
|-id=957 bgcolor=#fefefe
| 238957 ||  || — || January 25, 2006 || Kitt Peak || Spacewatch || V || align=right data-sort-value="0.82" | 820 m || 
|-id=958 bgcolor=#fefefe
| 238958 ||  || — || January 26, 2006 || Kitt Peak || Spacewatch || NYS || align=right data-sort-value="0.88" | 880 m || 
|-id=959 bgcolor=#fefefe
| 238959 ||  || — || January 26, 2006 || Kitt Peak || Spacewatch || — || align=right data-sort-value="0.80" | 800 m || 
|-id=960 bgcolor=#fefefe
| 238960 ||  || — || January 30, 2006 || Marly || Naef Obs. || — || align=right | 1.4 km || 
|-id=961 bgcolor=#fefefe
| 238961 ||  || — || January 23, 2006 || Mount Lemmon || Mount Lemmon Survey || NYS || align=right data-sort-value="0.78" | 780 m || 
|-id=962 bgcolor=#fefefe
| 238962 ||  || — || January 23, 2006 || Mount Lemmon || Mount Lemmon Survey || — || align=right | 1.8 km || 
|-id=963 bgcolor=#fefefe
| 238963 ||  || — || January 26, 2006 || Kitt Peak || Spacewatch || FLO || align=right | 1.0 km || 
|-id=964 bgcolor=#fefefe
| 238964 ||  || — || January 26, 2006 || Kitt Peak || Spacewatch || — || align=right | 1.1 km || 
|-id=965 bgcolor=#E9E9E9
| 238965 ||  || — || January 26, 2006 || Kitt Peak || Spacewatch || — || align=right | 2.3 km || 
|-id=966 bgcolor=#fefefe
| 238966 ||  || — || January 26, 2006 || Kitt Peak || Spacewatch || MAS || align=right data-sort-value="0.78" | 780 m || 
|-id=967 bgcolor=#fefefe
| 238967 ||  || — || January 26, 2006 || Kitt Peak || Spacewatch || V || align=right data-sort-value="0.80" | 800 m || 
|-id=968 bgcolor=#fefefe
| 238968 ||  || — || January 26, 2006 || Kitt Peak || Spacewatch || NYS || align=right data-sort-value="0.84" | 840 m || 
|-id=969 bgcolor=#E9E9E9
| 238969 ||  || — || January 31, 2006 || Kitt Peak || Spacewatch || — || align=right | 2.1 km || 
|-id=970 bgcolor=#fefefe
| 238970 ||  || — || January 25, 2006 || Kitt Peak || Spacewatch || NYS || align=right data-sort-value="0.91" | 910 m || 
|-id=971 bgcolor=#fefefe
| 238971 ||  || — || January 25, 2006 || Kitt Peak || Spacewatch || — || align=right | 1.1 km || 
|-id=972 bgcolor=#E9E9E9
| 238972 ||  || — || January 25, 2006 || Kitt Peak || Spacewatch || PAD || align=right | 3.3 km || 
|-id=973 bgcolor=#fefefe
| 238973 ||  || — || January 25, 2006 || Kitt Peak || Spacewatch || NYS || align=right data-sort-value="0.88" | 880 m || 
|-id=974 bgcolor=#fefefe
| 238974 ||  || — || January 25, 2006 || Kitt Peak || Spacewatch || — || align=right | 1.3 km || 
|-id=975 bgcolor=#fefefe
| 238975 ||  || — || January 26, 2006 || Mount Lemmon || Mount Lemmon Survey || — || align=right | 1.1 km || 
|-id=976 bgcolor=#E9E9E9
| 238976 ||  || — || January 26, 2006 || Kitt Peak || Spacewatch || — || align=right | 1.6 km || 
|-id=977 bgcolor=#fefefe
| 238977 ||  || — || January 27, 2006 || Mount Lemmon || Mount Lemmon Survey || — || align=right data-sort-value="0.85" | 850 m || 
|-id=978 bgcolor=#fefefe
| 238978 ||  || — || January 28, 2006 || Kitt Peak || Spacewatch || NYS || align=right data-sort-value="0.74" | 740 m || 
|-id=979 bgcolor=#fefefe
| 238979 ||  || — || January 28, 2006 || Kitt Peak || Spacewatch || — || align=right | 1.2 km || 
|-id=980 bgcolor=#fefefe
| 238980 ||  || — || January 30, 2006 || Kitt Peak || Spacewatch || V || align=right data-sort-value="0.79" | 790 m || 
|-id=981 bgcolor=#fefefe
| 238981 ||  || — || January 31, 2006 || Mount Lemmon || Mount Lemmon Survey || NYS || align=right data-sort-value="0.70" | 700 m || 
|-id=982 bgcolor=#fefefe
| 238982 ||  || — || January 31, 2006 || Catalina || CSS || — || align=right | 1.1 km || 
|-id=983 bgcolor=#fefefe
| 238983 ||  || — || January 31, 2006 || Kitt Peak || Spacewatch || MAS || align=right | 1.0 km || 
|-id=984 bgcolor=#E9E9E9
| 238984 ||  || — || January 26, 2006 || Catalina || CSS || — || align=right | 1.5 km || 
|-id=985 bgcolor=#fefefe
| 238985 ||  || — || January 30, 2006 || Kitt Peak || Spacewatch || — || align=right | 1.0 km || 
|-id=986 bgcolor=#E9E9E9
| 238986 ||  || — || January 30, 2006 || Kitt Peak || Spacewatch || MRX || align=right | 1.2 km || 
|-id=987 bgcolor=#E9E9E9
| 238987 ||  || — || January 30, 2006 || Kitt Peak || Spacewatch || — || align=right | 2.1 km || 
|-id=988 bgcolor=#E9E9E9
| 238988 ||  || — || January 31, 2006 || Mount Lemmon || Mount Lemmon Survey || — || align=right | 2.5 km || 
|-id=989 bgcolor=#E9E9E9
| 238989 ||  || — || January 31, 2006 || Kitt Peak || Spacewatch || EUN || align=right | 1.2 km || 
|-id=990 bgcolor=#fefefe
| 238990 ||  || — || January 31, 2006 || Kitt Peak || Spacewatch || NYS || align=right data-sort-value="0.88" | 880 m || 
|-id=991 bgcolor=#E9E9E9
| 238991 ||  || — || January 31, 2006 || Kitt Peak || Spacewatch || — || align=right | 1.6 km || 
|-id=992 bgcolor=#fefefe
| 238992 ||  || — || January 31, 2006 || Kitt Peak || Spacewatch || CLA || align=right | 3.2 km || 
|-id=993 bgcolor=#fefefe
| 238993 ||  || — || January 31, 2006 || Kitt Peak || Spacewatch || — || align=right data-sort-value="0.87" | 870 m || 
|-id=994 bgcolor=#E9E9E9
| 238994 ||  || — || January 31, 2006 || Kitt Peak || Spacewatch || — || align=right | 1.4 km || 
|-id=995 bgcolor=#E9E9E9
| 238995 ||  || — || January 31, 2006 || Kitt Peak || Spacewatch || — || align=right | 2.1 km || 
|-id=996 bgcolor=#fefefe
| 238996 ||  || — || January 30, 2006 || Kitt Peak || Spacewatch || — || align=right | 1.1 km || 
|-id=997 bgcolor=#fefefe
| 238997 ||  || — || February 1, 2006 || Mount Lemmon || Mount Lemmon Survey || — || align=right | 1.1 km || 
|-id=998 bgcolor=#fefefe
| 238998 ||  || — || February 2, 2006 || Mount Lemmon || Mount Lemmon Survey || FLO || align=right | 1.1 km || 
|-id=999 bgcolor=#fefefe
| 238999 ||  || — || February 2, 2006 || Kitt Peak || Spacewatch || NYS || align=right data-sort-value="0.86" | 860 m || 
|-id=000 bgcolor=#E9E9E9
| 239000 ||  || — || February 2, 2006 || Kitt Peak || Spacewatch || — || align=right | 2.2 km || 
|}

References

External links 
 Discovery Circumstances: Numbered Minor Planets (235001)–(240000) (IAU Minor Planet Center)

0238